This is an incomplete list of prehistoric mammals.  It does not include extant mammals or recently extinct mammals.  For extinct primate species, see: list of fossil primates.

Mammaliaformes

Genus †Adelobasileus Lucas & Hunt 1990
Genus †Bocaconodon Montellano, Hopson & Clark 2008
Genus †Delsatia Sigogneau-Russell & Godefroit 1997
Genus †Tricuspes von Huene 1933
Genus †Hadrocodium Luo, Crompton & Sun 2001
Genus †Fruitafossor Luo & Wible 2005

Order †Dinnetheria
Family †Dinnetheriidae Averianov & Lopatin 2011
Genus †Dinnetherium Jenkins, Crompton & Downs 1983

Order †Siconodontiformes
Family †Siconodontidae Mills 1971
Genus †Sinoconodon Patterson & Olson 1961

Order †Morganucodonta

Genus †Bridetherium Clemens 2011
Genus †Hallautherium Clemens 1980
Genus †Paceyodon Clemens 2011
Genus †Purbeckodon Butler et al. 2012
Genus †Rosierodon Debuysschere, Gherrbrant & Allain 2014
Family †Megazostrodontidae Cow 1986 sensu Kielan-Jaworowska, Cifelli & Luo 2004
Genus †Wareolestes Freeman 1979
Genus †Brachyzostrodon Sigogneau-Russell 1983a
Genus †Megazostrodon Crompton & Jenkins 1968
Family †Morganucodontidae Kühne 1958 
Genus †Gondwanadon Datta & Das 1996
Genus †Holwellconodon Lucas & Hunt 1990
Genus †Indotherium Yadagiri 1984 non Kretzoi 1942
Genus †Indozostrodon Datta & Das 2001
Genus †Helvetiodon Clemens 1980
Genus †Erythrotherium Crompton 1964
Genus †Eozostrodon Parrington 1941
Genus †Morganucodon Kühne 1949

Order †Docodonta
Middle to Late Jurassic
Family †Docodontidae
Genus †Agilodocodon Meng et al. 2015
Genus †Docofossor Luo et al. 2015
Genus †Gondtherium Prasad & Manhas 2007
Genus †Cyrtlatherium Freeman 1979 sensu Sigogneau-Russell 2001
Genus †Haldanodon Kühne & Krusat 1972 sensu Sigoneau-Russell 2003
Genus †Borealestes Waldman & Savage 1972
Genus †Dsugarodon Pfretzschner et al. 2005 [Acuodulodon Hu, Meng & Clark 2007]
Genus †Castorocauda Ji et al. 2006
Genus †Simpsonodon Kermack et al. 1987 
Genus †Krusatodon Sigogneau-Russell 2003
Genus †Hutegotherium Averianov et al. 2010
Genus †Tashkumyrodon Martin & Averianov 2004
Genus †Tegotherium Tatarinov 1994
Genus †Sibirotherium Maschenko, Lopatin & Voronkevich 2002
Genus †Reigitherium Bonaparte 1990
Genus †Peraiocynodon Simpson 1928
Genus †Docodon Marsh 1881 [Dicrocynodon Marsh 1880; Diplocynodon Marsh 1880 non Pomel 1847; Ennacodon Marsh 1890; Enneodon Marsh 1887 non Prangner 1845; Dryolestes Marsh 1879]

Order †Kuehneotheria
Family †Woustersiidae Sigogneau-Russell & Hahn 1995
Genus †Woutersia Sigogneau-Russell 1983b
Family †Kuehneotheriidae Kermack, Kermack & Musset 1968
Genus †Kuehneotherium Kermack, Kermack & Musset 1968
Genus †Kuehneon Kretzoi 1960 (nomen vanum)

Order †Eutriconodonta

Early Jurassic–Late Cretaceous
Genus ?†Dyskritodon Sigogneau-Russell 1995
Family †Amphidontidae Simpson 1925
Genus †Acinacodus Lopatin, Maschenko & Averianov 2010 
Genus †Amphidon Simpson 1925 
Genus †Gobiotheriodon Trofimov 1997 [Gobiodon Trofimov 1980 non Bleeker 1856]
Genus †Manchurodon Yabe & Shikama 1938
Genus †Nakunodon Yadagiri 1985
Genus †Aploconodon Simpson 1925
Genus †Comodon Kretzoi & Kretzoi 2000 non Stein 1859 [Phascolodon Simpson 1925; Phascolotheridium Cifelli & Dykes 2001]
Genus †Hakusanodon Rougier, Isaji & Manabe 2007
Genus †Juchilestes Gao, Wilson, Luo, Maga, Meng & Wang 2009
Family †Amphilestidae Osborn 1888 sensu Luo, Kielan-Jaworowska & Cifelli 2002 [Phascolotheriidae Osborn 1887]
Genus †Condorodon Gaetano & Rougier 2012
Genus †Kemchugia magna
Genus †Kryptotherium Sigogneau-Russell 2003
Genus †Liaotherium Zhou, Cheng & Wang 1991
Genus †Paikasigudodon Prasad & Manhas 2002 [Kotatherium yadagirii Prasad & Manhas 1997]
Genus †Amphilestes Owen 1871 [Amphitherium Owen 1845 non von Meyer non de Blainville 1838]
Genus †Phascolotherium Owen 1838 [Didelphys Broderip 1828; Thylacotherium Valenciennes 1838]
Genus †Tendagurodon Heinrich 1998
Family Jeholodentidae Luo et al. 2007
Genus †Jeholodens Luo, Chen, Li & Chen 2007
Genus †Yanoconodon Ji, Luo & Ji 1999
Family †Klameliidae Martin & Averianov 2007
Genus †Ferganodon Thomas & Averianov 2006
Genus †Klamelia Chow & Rich 1984
Family †Gobiconodontidae Chow & Rich 1984 sensu Luo, Kielan-Jaworowska & Cifelli 2002
Genus †Huasteconodon Montellano, Hopson & Clark 2008
Genus †Meemannodon Meng et al. 2005
Genus †Spinolestes Martin et al. 2015
Genus †Hangjinia Godefroit & Guo 1999
Genus †Gobiconodon Trofimov 1978 sensu Kielen-Jaworowsky & Dashzeveg 1998 [Guchinodon Trofimov 1978; Guchinodon Trofomiv 1974 nomen nudum]
Genus †Repenomamus Li et al. 2001
Clade †Volaticotheria Meng et al. 2006 emend. Meng et al. 2007
Genus †Volaticotherium Meng et al. 2006 emend. Meng et al. 2007
Genus †Ichthyoconodon Sigogneau-Russell 1995
Genus †Argentoconodon Rougier et al. 2007
Genus †Jugulator Cifelli & Madsen 1998
Genus †Triconolestes Engelmann & Callison 1998
Family †Triconodontidae Marsh 1887
Genus †Victoriaconodon Montellano et al. 2008
Genus †Priacodon Marsh 1887 [Tinodon]
Subfamily †Triconodontinae Marsh 1887 non Hay 1902
Genus †Triconodon Owen 1859 [Triacanthodon Owen 1871]
Genus †Trioracodon Simpson 1928 non Owen 1871
Subfamily †Alticonodontinae Fox 1976
Genus †Meiconodon Kusuhashi et al. 2009
Genus †Arundelconodon Cifelli et al. 1999
Genus †Astroconodon Patterson 1951
Genus †Alticonodon Fox 1969
Genus †Corviconodon Cifelli, Wible & Jenkins 1998

Symmetrodonta incertae sedis
Genus †Atlasodon Sigogneau-Russell 1991
Genus †Kennetheredium Sigogneau-Russell 2003a
Genus †Kotatherium Datta 1981
Genus †Trishulotherium Yadagiri 1985

Basal Cladotheria
Genus †Afriquiamus Sigogneau-Russell 1999
Genus †Butlerigale Kühne 1968 [?Dryolestes leiriensis]
Genus †Chunnelodon Ensom & Sigogneau-Russell 1998
Genus †Guimarota Kuhne 1968

Basal Zatheria
Genus †Minimus Sigogneau-Russell 1999
Genus †Magnimus Sigogneau-Russell 1999
Genus †Nanolestes Martin 2002
Family †Arguimuridae Dashzeveg 1994 [Arguitheriidae Dashzeveg 1994]
Genus †Arguimus 1979 [Arguitherium Dashzeveg 1994]
Family †Mozomuridae Li et al. 2005
Genus †Mozomus Li et al. 2005

Subclass Yinotheria

Order †Shuotherida
Family †Shuotheriidae Chow & Rich 1982
Genus †Itatodon Lopatin & Averianov 2005
Genus †Shuotherium Chow & Rich 1982
Genus †Paritatodon Martin & Averianov 2010
Genus †Pseudotribos Luo, Ji & Yuan 2007

Order †Ausktribosphenida
Family †Ausktribosphenidae Rich et al. 1997
Genus †Bishops Rich et al. 2001
Genus †Ausktribosphenos Rich et al. 1997

Order †Henosferida
Family †Henosferidae Rougier et al. 2007
Genus †Henosferus Rougier et al. 2007
Genus †Asfaltomylos Rauhut et al. 2002
Genus †Ambondro Flynn et al. 1999

Order Monotremata

Middle Cretaceous–Recent
Genus †Teinolophos Rich et al. 1999
Genus †Kryoryctes Pridmore et al. 2005
Family †Kollikodontidae Flannery et al. 1995
Genus †Kollikodon Flannery et al. 1995
Family Ornithorhynchidae Gray 1825 [Steropodontidae Archer et al. 1985] (Platypuses)
Genus †Monotrematum Pascual et al. 1992
Genus †Steropodon Archer et al. 1985
Genus †Obdurodon Woodburne & Tedford 1975
Family Tachyglossidae Gill 1872 [Echidnidae Burnett 1830] (echidnas, spiny anteaters)
Genus Zaglossus Gill 1877 [Proechidna Gervais 1877; Acanthoglossus Gervais 1877; Bruynia Dubois 1882; Bruijia Thomas 1883; Prozaglossus Kerbert 1913; Megalibgwilia Griffiths, Wells & Barrie 1991] (Extant genus with extinct species)

Subclass Allotheria

Order †Haramiyida
Genus †Kirtlingtonia Butler & Hooker 2005 [tooth-taxa]
Genus †Millsoson Butler & Hooker 2005 [tooth-taxa]
Family †Haramiyaviidae Butler 2000
Genus †Haramiyavia Jenkins et al. 1997
Family †Eleutherodontidae Kermack et al. 1998 [Arboroharamiyidae Zheng et al. 2013; Euharamiyida Bi et al. 2014; Eleutherodontida Kermack et al. 1998]
Genus †Megaconus Zhou et al. 2013
Genus †Shenshou Bi et al. 2014
Genus †Arboroharamiya Zheng et al. 2013
Genus †Eleutherodon Kermack et al. 1998 
Genus †Xianshou Bi et al. 2014
Genus †Sineleutherus Martin, Averianov & Pfretzschner 2010
Family †Theroteinidae Sigogneau-Russell, Frank & Hammerle 1986
Genus †Theroteinus Sigogneau-Russell, Frank & Hammerle 1986
Family †Thomasiidae Poche 1908 [Haramiyidae Simpson 1947 sensu Jenkins et al. 1997; Microlestidae Murry 1866; Microcleptidae Simpson 1928]
Genus †Eoraetica
Genus †Avashishta Anantharaman & al. 2006
Genus †Allostaffia Heinrich 2004 [Staffia Heinrich 1999  non Schubert 1911]
Genus †Thomasia Poche 1908 [Haramiya Simpson 1947; Hypnoprymnopsis Dawkins 1864; Microlestes Plieninger 1847 non Schmidt Goebel 1846; Microcleptes Simpson 1928 non Newman 1840; Plieningeria Krausse 1919; Stathmodon Henning 1911]

Order †Multituberculata
Late Jurassic–Eocene
Genus †Argillomys Cifelli, Gordon & Lipka 2013
Genus †Janumys erebos Eaton & Cifelli 2001
Genus †Xyronomys Rigby 1980
Family †Plagiaulacidae Gill 1872 sensu Kielan-Jaworowska & Hurum 2001 [Bolodontidae Osborn 1887]
Family †Hahnotheriidae Butler & Hooker 2005
Family †Kermackodontidae Butler & Hooker 2005
Family †Albionbaataridae Kielan-Jaworowska & Ensom 1994
Family †Eobaataridae Kielan-Jaworowska, Dashzeveg & Trofimov 1987
Superfamily †Allodontoidea Marsh 1889
Genus †Glirodon Engelmann & Callison 2001
Family †Arginbaataridae Hahn & Hahn 1983 non Trofimov 1980
Family †Zofiabaataridae Bakker 1992
Family †Allodontidae Marsh 1889
Superfamily †Paulchoffatioidea Hahn 1969 sensu Hahn & Hahn 2003
Genus †Mojo Hahn, LePage & Wouters 1987
Genus †Rugosodon Yuan et al. 2013
Family †Hahnodontidae Sigigneau-Russell 1991
Family †Pinheirodontidae Hahn & Hahn 1999
Family †Paulchoffatiidae Hahn 1969 sensu McKenna & Bell 1997
Suborder †Gondwanatheria
Family †Ferugliotheriidae Bonaparte 1986
Family †Sudamericidae Scillato-Yané & Pascual 1984 [Gondwanatheridae Bonaparte 1986]
Family †Groeberiidae Patterson 1952 sensu Flynn & Wyss 1999
Suborder †Cimolodonta
Genus †Ameribaatar Eaton & Cifelli 2001
Genus †Argentodites Kielan-Jaworowska et al. 2007
Genus †Bryceomys Eaton 1995
Genus †Bubodens Wilson 1987
Genus †Cedaromys Eaton & Cifelli 2001
Genus †Clemensodon Krause 1992 [Kimbetohia cambi, in partim]
Genus †Dakotamys Eaton 1995
Genus †Fractimus Higgins 2003
Genus †Halodon Marsh 1889
Genus †Uzbekbaatar Kielan-Jaworowska & Nesov 1992
Genus †Viridomys Fox 1971
Genus †Paracimexomys Archibald 1982 [Barbatodon Rãdulescu & Samson 1987]
Genus †Cimexomys Sloan & Van Valen 1965 sensu stricto?
Genus †Fractinus Higgins 2003
Family †Corriebaataridae Rich et al. 2009
Family †Boffiidae Hahn & Hahn 1983 sensu Kielan-Jaworowska & Hurum 2001
Family †Cimolomyidae Marsh 1889 sensu Kielan-Jaworowska & Hurum 2001
Family †Kogaionidae Rãdulescu & Simpson 1996
Family †Eucosmodontidae Jepsen 1940
Family †Microcosmodontidae Holtzman & Wolberg 1977
Superfamily †Ptilodontoidea Cope 1887 sensu McKenna & Bell 1997 & Kielan-Jaworowska & Hurum 2001
Genus †Neoliotomus Jepsen 1930
Family †Cimolodontidae Marsh 1889 sensu Kielan-Jaworowska & Hurum 2001
Family †Ptilodontidae Cope 1887 sensu McKenna & Bell 1997
Superfamily †Taeniolabidoidea Granger & Simpson 1929 sensu Kielan-Jaworowska & Hurum 2001
Family †Taeniolabididae Granger & Simpson 1929
Superfamily †Djadochtatheroidea Kielan-Jaworowska & Hurum 1997 sensu Kielan-Jaworowska & Hurum 2001 Djadochtatheria Kielan-Jaworowska & Hurum 1997]
Genus †Bulganbaatar Kielan-Jaworowska 1974
Genus †Nemegtbaatar Kielan-Jaworowska 1974
Genus †Pentacosmodon Jepsen 1940
Family †Chulsanbaataridae Kielan-Jaworowska 1974
Family †Sloanbaataridae Kielan-Jaworowska 1974
Family †Djadochtatheriidae Kielan-Jaworowska & Hurum 1997

Subclass Theria

Basal Theria
Genus †Aethomylos Novacek 1976
Genus †Anisorhizus Ameghino 1902 (notoungulate)
Genus †Falepterus Clemens & Lillegraven 1986
Genus †Paleomolops Cifelli 1994
Genus †Tetraprothomo Ameghino 1902 non Ameghino 1884
Genus †Tribotherium Sigogneau-Russell 1991
Genus †Zygiocuspis Cifelli 1990
Family †Endotheriidae Shikama 1947
Genus †Endotherium Shikama 1947
Family †Kermackiidae Butler 1978
Genus †Kermackia Slaughter 1971 [Trinictitherium Butler 1978]
Family †Plicatodontidae Ameghino 1904
Genus †Plicatodon Ameghino 1904
Family †Potamotelsidae Nesov 1987
Genus †Potamotelses Fox 1972 non Nesov 1987
Family †Russellmyidae Estravis 1990
Genus †Russellmys Estravis 1990

Infraclass †Pantotheria
Genus †Tribactonodon Sigogneau-Russell, Hooker & Ensom 2001
Genus †Paraungulatum Bonaparte 1999
Genus †Argaliatherium Cifelli & Davis 2015
Genus †Carinalestes Cifelli & Davis 2015
Genus †Hypomylos Sigogneau-Russell 1992
Family †Casamiqueliidae Bonaparte 1999
Genus †Casamiquelia Bonaparte 1990 [after Averianov 2002]
Genus †Rougiertherium Bonaparte 1999
Genus †Alamitherium Bonaparte 1999
Family †Brandoniidae Bonaparte 1992
Genus †Brandonia Bonaparte 1992
Family †Donodontidae Sigogneau-Russell 1991
Genus †Donodon Sigogneau-Russell 1991
Family †Paurodontidae Marsh 1887 non Thorne 1941
Genus †Araeodon Simpson 1937
Genus †Archaeotrigon Simpson 1927
Genus †Brancatherulum Dietrich 1927
Genus †Comotherium Prothero 1981
Genus †Dorsetodon Ensom & Sigogneau-Russell 1998
Genus †Drescheratherium Krebs 1998
Genus †Euthlastus Simpson 1927
Genus †Foxraptor Bakker & Carpenter 1990
Genus †Henkelotherium Krebs 1991
Genus †Paurodon Marsh 1887
Genus †Tathiodon (Simpson 1927) Simpson 1927 [Tanaodon Simpson1927 non Kirk 1927; Pelicopsis Simpson 1927]
Family †Vincelestidae Bonaparte 1986
Genus †Vincelestes Bonaparte 1986
Family †Picopsidae Fox 1980
Genus †Picopsis Fox 1980
Genus †Tirotherium Montellano-Ballesteros & Fox 2015

Order †Spalacotheriida
Genus †Gobiotheriodon Trofimov 1997 sensu Averianov 2002 [Gobiodon Trofimov 1980 non Bleeker 1856] 
Genus †Maotherium Rougier, Ji & Novacek 2003
Family †Thereuodontidae Sigogneau-Russell 1998
Genus †Thereuodon Sigogneau-Russell 1987
Family †Zhangheotheriidae Rougier, Ji & Novacek 2003
Genus †Zhangheotherium Hu et al. 1997
Family †Tinodontidae Fox 1985
Subfamily †Bondesiinae Bonaparte 1990
Genus †Bondesius Bonaparte 1990 [?archaeonycterid microbat; dryolestid milk teeth (Averianov 2002)]
Subfamily †Tinodontinae
Genus †Mictodon Fox 1984
Genus †Yermakia Lopatin et al. 2005 [?Ungulatomorpha]
Genus †Tinodon Marsh 1879 [Menacodon Marsh 1887; Eurylambda Simpson 1929a]
Family †Barbereniidae Bonaparte 1990
Genus †Quirogatherium Bonaparte 1990 [? dryolestid milk teeth (Averianov 2002)]
Genus †Barberenia Bonaparte 1990 [? dryolestid milk teeth (Averianov 2002)]
Family †Spalacotheriidae Marsh 1887 [Peratheridae Osborn 1887]
Genus †Infernolestes Cifelli, Davis & Sames 2014
Genus †Microderson Sigogneau-Russell 1991 [? stem-group zatherian (Averianov 2002)]
Genus †Shalbaatar Nesov 1997
Genus †Yaverlestes Sweetman 2008
Subfamily †Spalacotheriinae Marsh 1887
Genus †Spalacotherium Owen 1854 [Peralestes Owen 1871]
Subfamily †Spalacolestinae Cifelli & Madsen 1999
Genus †Aliaga Cuenca-Bescós et al. 2014
Genus †Symmetrolestes Tsubamoto et al. 2004
Genus †Akidolestes Li & Luo 2006
Genus †Heishanlestes Hu, Fox, Wang & Li 2005
Genus †Spalacotheroides Patterson 1955
Genus †Spalacotheridium Cifelli 1990c
Genus †Spalacolestes Cifelli 1999
Genus †Symmetrodontoides Fox 1979 [?Dryolestidans Bonaparte 1999]

Order †Meridiolestida
Genus †Leonardus Bonaparte 1990
Genus †Cronopio Rougier, Apesteguia & Gaetano 2011
Family †Necrolestidae Ameghino 1894
Genus †Necrolestes Ameghino 1894 sensu Rougier et al. 2012
Superfamily †Mesungulatoidea
Family †Reigitheriidae Bonaparte 1990
Genus †Reigitherium Bonaparte 1990
Family †Peligotheriidae Bonaparte, Van Valen & Kramartz 1993
Genus †Peligrotherium Bonaparte, Van Valen & Kramartz 1993 
Family †Mesungulatidae Bonaparte 1986 sensu Rougier et al. 2009
Genus †Coloniatherium Rougier et al. 2009
Genus †Mesungulatum Bonaparte & Soria 1985
Family †Austrotriconodontidae Bonaparte 1992
Genus †Austrotriconodon Bonaparte 1986b

Order †Dryolestida
Family †Dryolestidae Marsh 1879
Genus †Anthracolestes Averianov, Martin & Lopatin 2014
Genus †Guimarotodus Martin 1999
Genus †Krebsotherium Martin 1999
Genus †Phascolestes Owen 1871
Genus †Lakotalestes Cifelli, Davis & Sames 2014
Genus †Laolestes Simpson 1927
Genus †Melanodon Simpson 1927 [Malthacolestes Simpson 1927]
Genus †Amblotherium Owen 1871 [Stylodon Owen 1866 non Beck 1837; Achyrodon Owen 1871; Odontostylus Trouessant 1898; Trouessartia Cossman 1899 non Canestrini & Kramer 1899; Trouessartiella Cossman 1899; Stylacodon Marsh 1879; Laodon Marsh 1887; Kepolestes Simpson 1927]
Genus †Dryolestes Marsh 1878 [Asthenodon Marsh 1887; Herpetairus Simpson 1927; Laolestes Simpson 1927]
Genus †Portopinheirodon Martin 1999
Genus †Peraspalax Owen 1871 [Amblotherium Lydekker 1887]
Genus †Kurtodon Osborn 1887 [Athrodon Osborn 1887 non Sauvage 1880; Odontocyrtus Trouessart 1905]
Genus †Crusafontia Henkel & Krebs 1969
Genus †Groeberitherium Bonaparte 1986

Order †Amphitheriida
Family †Amphitheriidae Owen 1846
Genus †Amphibetulimus Lopatin & Averianov 2007
Genus †Amphitherium de Blainville 1838 non Owen 1845 non von Meyer [Amphigonus Agassiz 1838; Amphitylus Osborn 1888; Botheratiotherium de Blainville 1838; Heterotherium de Blainville 1838 non Fischer de Waldheim 1822; Thylacotherium Valenciennes 1838]

Order †Peramurida
Family †Peramuridae Kretzoi 1946
Genus †Kiyatherium Maschenko, Lopatin & Voronkevich 2002
Genus †Tendagurutherium Heinrich 1998
Genus †Peramuroides Davis 2012
Genus †Kuriogenys Davis 2012
Genus †Peramus Owen 1871 [Leptocladus Owen 1871]
Genus †Palaeoxonodon Freeman 1976
Genus †Abelodon Brunet et al. 1991
Genus †Pocamus Canudo & Cuenca-Bescós 1996

Order †Aegialodontia
Family †Aegialodontidae Kermack 1967
Genus †Aegialodon Kermack, Lees & Mussett 1965
Genus †Kielantherium Dashzeveg 1975

Order †Pappotherida
Family †Pappotheriidae Slaughter 1965
Genus †Paraisurus non Glikman 1957
Genus †Pappotherium Slaughter 1965
Genus †Slaughteria Butler 1978

Infraclass Metatheria
Late Cretaceous–Recent

Metatheria incertae sedis
Genus †Sinodelphys Luo et al. 2003
Genus †Anchistodelphys Cifelli 1990
Genus †Arcantiodelphs Vullo, Gherbrant Muizon & Neraudeau 2009
Genus †Dakotadens Eaton 1993
Genus †Camptomus Marsh 1889
Genus †Iqualadelphys Fox 1987
Family †Adinodontidae Hershkovitz 1995
Genus †Adinodon Hershkovitz 1995
Genus †Varalphadon Johanson 1996
Genus †Bistius Clemens & Lillegraven 1986 
Genus †Turgidodon Cifelli 1990
Genus †Swainadelphys Johanson 1996
Genus †Esteslestes Novacek et al. 1991
Genus †Copedelphys Korth 1994
Genus †Itaboraidelphys Marshall & de Muizon 1984
Genus †Marmosopsis Couto 1962
Genus †Mizquedelphys Marshall & de Muizon 1988
Genus †Otolicnus Illiger 1811
Genus †Pauladelphys Goin et al. 1999
Genus †Pucadelphys Marshall & de Muizon 1988
Genus †Andinodelphys Marshall & de Muizon 1988
Genus †Szalinia de Muizon & Cifelli 2001
Genus †Djarthia Godthelp, Wroe & Archer 1999
Family †Jaskhadelphysidae Marshall & de Muizon 1988
Genus †Jaskhadelphys Marshall & de Muizon 1988 
Family †Herpetotheriidae Trouessant 1879
Genus †Herpetotherium Cope 1873
Genus †Amphiperatherium Filhol 1879 [Oxygomphius von Meyer 1846 nomen oblitum; Microtarsioides Weigelt 1933; Ceciliolemur Weigelt 1933; Ceciliolemuridae Weigelt 1933]
Genus †Asiadidelphis Gabunia, Shevyreva & Gabunia 1990
Genus †Garadelphys [Garatherium Crochet 1984]
Genus †Golerdelphys Williamson & Lofgren 2014
Genus †Entomacodon Marsh 1872 [Centracodon Marsh 1872]
Genus †Maastrichtidelphys Martin et al. 2005
Genus †Nortedelphys Case, Goin & Woodburne 2005
Genus †Rumiodon Goin & Candela 2004
Family †Hondadelphidae Marshall, Case & Woodburne 1990
Genus †Hondadelphys Marshall 1976

Basal Metatheria
Genus †Aenigmadelphys Cifelli & Johanson 1994
Genus †Archaeonothos Beck 2015
Genus †Duquettichnus  Sarjeant & Thulborn 1986 {Marsupialipida} [trace fossils]
Genus †Ghamidtherium Sánches-Villagra et al. 2007
Genus †Kasserinotherium Crochet 1989
Genus †Palangania Goin et al. 1998
Genus †Perrodelphys Goin et al. 1999
Family †Numbigilgidae Beck et al. 2008
Genus †Numbigilga Beck et al. 2008

Ameridelphia incertae sedis
Genus †Adelodelphys Cifelli 2004
Genus †Apistodon Davis 2007
Genus †Cocatherium Goin et al. 2006
Genus †Iugomortiferum Cifelli 1990b
Genus †Marambiotherium Goin et al. 1999
Genus †Pascualdelphys fierroensis
Genus †Progarzonia Ameghino 1904
Genus †Protalphadon Cifelli 1990
Genus †Sinbadelphys Cifelli 2004

Order †Protodelphia
Family †Holoclemensiidae Alpin & Archer 1987
Genus †Holoclemensia Slaughter 1968 [Clemensia Slaughter 1968 non Packard 1864; Comanchea Jacobs, Winkler & Murry 1989]

Order †Deltatheroida
Genus †Atokatheridium Kielan-Jaworowska & Cifelli 2001
Genus †Khuduklestes Nesov, Sigogneau-Russell & Russell 1994
Family †Deltatheridiidae Gregory & Simpson 1926 [Nanocuridae Fox, Scott & Bryant 2007; Sulestinae Nessov 1985]
Genus †Hydotherium Gregory & Simpson 1926
Genus †Lotheridium Bi et al. 2015
Genus †Nanocuris Fox, Scott & Bryant 2007
Genus †Prodeltitheridium Trofimov 1984
Genus †Oklatheridium Davis, Cifelli & Kielan-Jaworowska 2008
Genus †Oxlestes Nesov 1982
Genus †Deltatheridium Gregory & Simpson 1926
Genus †Sulestes Nesov 1985 [Deltatherus Nesov 1997; Marsasia Nesov 1997]
Genus †Tsagandelta Rougier, Davis & Novacek 2015
Genus †Deltatheroides Gregory & Simpson 1926

Order †Asiadelphia
Family †Asiatheriidae Trofimov & Szalay 1994 [Asiadelphidae Trofimov & Szalay 1994]
Genus †Kokopellia Cifelli 1993
Genus †Asiatherium Trofimov & Szalay 1994 [Asiatherium Trofimov & Cuny 1993 (nomen nudum)]

Order †Alphadontia
Family †Alphadontidae Marshall, Case & Woodburne 1990
Genus †Eoalphadon Eaton 2009
Genus †Albertatherium Fox 1971
Genus †Alphadon Simpson 1927
Family †Pediomyidae Simpson 1927 [Aquiladelphidae Davis 2007]
Genus †Monodelphopsis de Paula Couto 1952 [? microbiotheriid (Marshall et al. 1990)]
Genus †Aletridelphys Davis 2007 [Protolambda Osborn 1898; Synconodon Osborn 1898]
Genus †Leptalestes Davis 2007
Genus †Aquiladelphis Fox 1971
Genus †Pediomys Marsh 1889 
Family †Stagodontidae Marsh 1889 sensu McKenna & Bell 1997
Genus †Boreodon Lambe 1902 (nomen dubium)
Genus †Pariadens Cifelli & Eaton 1987
Genus †Delphodon Simpson 1927
Genus †Eodelphis Matthew 1916
Genus †Didelphodon Marsh 1889 [Diaphorodon Archer 1869; Stagodon Marsh 1889; Thlaeodon Cope 1892; Ectoconodon Osborn 1898; Didelphops Marsh 1889]

Order †Simpsonitheria
Genus †Hondonadia Goin & Candela 1998
Superfamily †Caroloameghinioidea Ameghino 1901 sensu Marshall 1987
Genus †Hatcheritherium Case, Goin & Woodburne 2005
Family †Chulpasiidae Sigé et al. 2009
Genus †Chulpasia Crochet & Sigé 1993
Family †Glasbiidae Clemens 1966 sensu Archer 1984
Genus †Glasbius Clemens 1966
Family †Caroloameghiidae Ameghino 1901
Genus †Procaroloameghinia Marshall 1982
Genus †Robertbutleria Marshall 1987
Genus †Caroloameghinia Ameghino 1901
Superfamily †Argyrolagoidea Ameghino 1904 sensu Simpson 1970
Family †Gashterniidae Marshall 1987
Genus †Gashternia Simpson 1935
Family †Argyrolagidae Ameghino 1904 [Microtragulidae Reig 1955]
Genus †Proargyrolagus Wolff 1984
Genus †Hondalagus Villarroel & Marshall 1988
Genus †Argyrolagus Ameghino 1904 [Microtragulus Ameghino 1904 McKenna & Bell 1997]
Genus †Microtragulus Ameghino 1904 [Argyrolagus Ameghino 1904 sensu McKenna & Bell 1997]

Order †Peradectia
Family †Peradectidae Crochet 1979
Genus †Armintodelphys Krishtalka & Stucky 1983
Genus †Indodelphis Bajpai et al. 2005
Genus †Mimoperadectes Bown & Rose 1979
Genus †Nanodelphys McGrew 1937 Didelphidectes Hough 1961
Genus †Alloeodectes Russell 1984
Genus †Sinoperadectes Storch & Qui 2002
Genus †Siamoperadectes Ducrocq et al. 1992
Genus †Peradectes Matthew & Granger 1921 [Thylacodon Matthew & Granger 1921]

Order †Sparassodonta
Genus †Dukecynus Goin 1997
Genus †Pseudonotictis Marschall 1981
Genus †Sallacyon Villarroel & Marshall 1982 [Andinogale Hoffstetter & Petter 1983]
Family †Mayulestidae de Muizon 1994
Genus †Mayulestes de Muizon 1994
Genus †Allqokirus Marshall & de Muizon 1988
Family †Proborhyaenidae Ameghino 1897 [Arminiheringiidae Ameghino 1902]
Genus †Arminiheringia Ameghino 1902 [Dilestes Ameghino 1902]
Genus †Callistoe Babot, Powell & Muizon 2002
Genus †Paraborhyaena Hoffstetter & Petter 1983
Genus †Proborhyaena Ameghino 1897
Family †Prothylacinidae Ameghino 1894
Genus †Pseudothylacinus Ameghino 1902
Genus †Prothylacynus Ameghino 1891 [Prothylacocyon Winge 1923; Napodonictis Ameghino 1894]
Genus †Lycopsis Cabrera 1927
Genus †Stylocynus Mercerat 1917
Genus †Pseudolycopsis Marshall 1976
Family †Thylacosmilidae Riggs 1933 sensu Marshall 1976 
Genus †Achlysictis Ameghino 1891
Genus †Anachlysictis Goin 1997
Genus †Patagosmilus Forasiepi & Carlini 2010
Genus †Hyaenodontops Ameghino 1908 [?Thylacosmilus Riggs 1933]
Genus †Notosmilus Kraglievich 1960 [?Thylacosmilus Riggs 1933]
Genus †Thylacosmilus Riggs 1933 [?Notosmilus Kraglievich 1960; ?Hyaenodontops Ameghino 1908; Achlysictis Ameghino 1891; Acrohyaenodon Ameghino 1904]
Family †Hathliacynidae Ameghino 1894 [Cladictidae Winge 1923; Cladosictidae Cabreta 1927; Cladosictinae Cabrera 1927; Acyonidae Ameghino 1889; Amphiproviverridae Ameghino 1894]
Genus †Patene Simpson 1935 [Ischyrodelphis de Paula Couto 1952]
Genus †Palaeocladosictis de Paula Couto 1961
Genus †Procladosictis Ameghino 1902
Genus †Contrerascynus Mones 2014 [Simpsonia Contreras 1990 non]
Genus †Pseudocladosictis Ameghino 1902
Genus †Notogale Loomis 1914
Genus †Cladosictis Ameghino 1887 [Amphithereutes Ameghino 1935; Agustylus Ameghino 1887; Hathliacynus Ameghino 1887;  Ictioborus  Ameghino 1891; Anatherium Ameghino 1887; Acyon Ameghino 1887]
Genus †Sipalocyon Ameghino 1887 [Thylacodictis Mercerat 1891; Amphiproviverra Ameghino 1891; Protoproviverra Ameghino 1891 non Lemoine 1891; Perathereutes Ameghino 1891]
Genus †Chasicostylus Reig 1957
Genus †Notictis Ameghino 1889
Genus †Notocynus Mercerat 1891
Genus †Borhyaenidium Pascual & Bocchino 1963 [Pascual & Ringuelet 1963]
Family †Borhyaenidae Ameghino 1894 [Sparassodontidae Roger 1896; Conodonictidae Ameghino 1935]
Genus †Nemolestes Ameghino 1902
Genus †Argyrolestes Ameghino 1902
Genus †Angelocabrerus Simpson 1970
Genus †Australohyaena Forasiepi, Babot & Zimicz 2014
Genus †Fredszalaya Shockey & Anaya 2008
Genus †Pharsophorus Ameghino 1897 [Plesiofelis Roth 1903]
Genus †Borhyaena Ameghino 1887 [Arctodictis Mercerat 1891; Conodonictis Ameghino 1891; Dynamictis Ameghino 1891; Pseudoborhyaena Ameghino 1902]
Genus †Acrocyon Ameghino 1887
Genus †Eutemnodus Bravard 1858 [Eutemnodus Burmeister 1885; Apera Ameghino 1886 non Adanson 1763; Entemnodus Trouessant 1885]
Genus †Parahyaenodon Ameghino 1904

Order Didelphimorphia
Family †Derorhynchidae Marshall 1987
Genus †Minusculodelphis de Paula Couto 1962
Genus †Derorhynchus de Paula Couto 1952
Family †Sparassocynidae Reig 1958 sensu Archer 1984
Genus †Sparassocynus Mercerat 1898 [Perazoyphium Cebrera 1928] 
Family Didelphidae Gray 1821 (American opossums)
Genus †Incadelphys Marshall & de Muizon 1988
Genus †Coona Simpson 1938
Genus †Sairadelphys Oliveira et al. 2011
Subfamily †Eobrasiliinae Marshall 1987
Genus †Tiulordia Marshall & de Muizon 1988
Genus †Eobrasilia Simpson 1947
Genus †Gaylordia de Paula Couto 1952 [Xenodelphis de Paula Couto 1962]
Genus †Didelphopsis de Paula Couto 1952
Subfamily Didelphinae Grey 1821
Tribe Didelphini Grey 1821
Genus †Hyperdidelphys Ameghino 1904 [Paradidelphys Ameghino 1904; Cladodidelphys Ameghino 1904]
Genus †Thylophorops Reig 1952
Tribe Marmosini Hershkovitz 1992 [Monodelphinae Talice, de Mosera & Machado 1960 nomen nudum sensu Hershkovitz; Monodelphini Talice, de Mosera & Machado 1960 nomen nudum sensu McKenna & Bell 1997]
Subtribe †Zygolestina Marshall 1982
Genus †Zygolestes Ameghino 1898
Subtribe Monodelphina Talice, de Mosera & Machado 1960 [Marmosidae Hershkovitz 1992; Lestodelphyinae Hershkovitz 1992]
Genus †Thylatheridium Reig 1952

Order Paucituberculata

Genus †Bardalestes Goin et al. 2009 [Dracolestes Goin et al. 2009 nomen nudum
Genus †Evolestes Goin et al. 2007
Superfamily Caenolestoidea Trouessant 1898 sensu Osborn 1910 [Palaeothentoidea Goin et al. 2009]
Genus †Riolestes Goin et al. 2009
Genus †Carolopaulacoutoia McKenna & Bell 1997 [Sternbergia de Paula Couto 1970 non Jordan & Gilbert 1925]
Family †Palaeothentidae Sinclair 1906  [Epanorthidae Ameghino 1889; Decastidae Ameghino 1893 ]
Genus †Antawallathentes Rincón et al. 2015 
Genus †Hondathentes Dumont & Bown 1997  [Hondathentes Dumont & Bown 1993 nomen nudum ]
Genus †Sasawatsu Goin & Candela 2004 
Subfamily †Acdestinae Bown & Fleagle 1993 
Genus †Acdestoides Bown & Fleagle 1993 
Genus †Acdestodon Bown & Fleagle 1993 
Genus †Trelewthentes Bown & Fleagle 1993 
Genus †Acdestis Ameghino 1887 [Dipilus Ameghino 1890; Decastis Ameghino 1891; Callomenus Ameghino 1891]
Subfamily †Palaeothentinae Sinclair 1906 
Genus †Palaeothentes Ameghino 1887  [Epanorthus Ameghino 1889; Essoprion Ameghino 1891; Halmadromus Ameghino 1891; Halmaselus Ameghino 1891; Metriodromus Ameghino 1894; Metaepanorthus Ameghino 1894; Paraepanorthus Ameghino 1894; Prepanorthus Ameghino 1894; Cladoclinus Ameghino 1894; Palaepanorthus Ameghino 1902]
Genus †Titanothentes Rae, Bown & Fleagle 1996 
Genus †Pilchenia Ameghino 1903 
Genus †Carlothentes Bown & Fleagle 1993 
Genus †Propalaeothentes Bown & Fleagle 1993 
Family †Abderitidae Ameghino 1889 
Genus †Pitheculites Ameghino 1902 [Eomannodon Ameghino 1902b; Micrabderites Simpson 1932]
Genus †Abderites Ameghino 1887 [Homunculites Ameghino 1902; Homunculites Ameghino 1901 nomen nudum]
Family Caenolestidae Trouessant 1898 Garzoniidae Ameghino 1890] (Shrew Opossums)
Genus †Fieratherium Forasiepi et al. 2013
Genus †Perulestes Goin & Candela 2004
Subfamily †Pichipilinae Marshall 1980 sensu McKenna & Bell 1997
Genus †Pichipilus Ameghino 1890
Genus †Phonocdromus Ameghino 1894
Genus †Pliolestes Reig 1955
Subfamily Caenolestinae Trouessant 1898
Genus †Pseudhalmarhiphus Ameghino 1903
Genus †Stilotherium Ameghino 1887 [Garzonia Ameghino 1891; Halmatorhiphus Winge 1923; Parhalmarhiphus Ameghino 1894; Halmarhiphus Ameghino 1891]

Order †Polydolopimorphia
Family †Protodidelphidae Marshall 1987
Genus †Carolocoutoia Goin, Oliveira & Candela 1998
Genus †Bobbschaefferia de Paula Couto 1970 [Schaefferia Paula Couto 1952 non Absolon 1900 non Houbert 1918; Depaulacoutonia Kretzoi & Kretzoi 2000]
Genus †Zeusdelphys Marshall 1982
Genus †Periprotodidelphis Oliveira & Goin 2011
Genus †Protodidelphis de Paula Couto 1952 [Robertbutleria Marshall 1987]
Genus †Guggenheimia de Paula Couto 1952
Genus †Reigia Pascual 1983
Superfamily †Polydolopoidea Ameghino 1897 sensu Clemens & Marshall 1976
Genus †Rosendolops Goin & Candela 1996
Genus †Ectocentrocristus Rigby & Wolberg 1987 sensu Case, Goin & Woodburne 2005
Family †Sillustaniidae Crochet & Sigé 1996
Genus †Sillustania Crochet & Sigé 1996
Family †Bonapartheriidae Pascual 1980 [Epidolopinae Pascual & Bond 1981 non Marshall 1982]
Genus †Epidolops de Paula Couto 1952 sensu Goin & al 2003
Genus †Bonapartherium Pascual 1980
Family †Prepidolopidae Pascual 1980
Genus †Prepidolops Pascual 1980
Genus †Wamradolops Goin & Candela 2004
Genus †Incadolops Goin & Candela 2004
Family †Polydolopidae Ameghino 1897 [Promysopidae Ameghino 1902]
Genus †Roberthoffstetteria Marshall, de Muizon & Sigé 1983 sensu Goin & al 2003
Subfamily Parabderitinae Marshall 1980 sensu McKenna & Bell 1997
Genus †Parabderites Ameghino 1902 [Tideus Ameghino 1890 non Koch 1837; Mannodon Ameghino 1893] 
Subfamily Polydolopinae Ameghino 1897 sensu Pascual & Bond 1981
Genus †Polydolops Ameghino 1897 [Pliodolops Ameghino 1902; Orthodolops Ameghino 1903; Anissodolops Ameghino 1903; Archaeodolops Ameghino 1903; Antarctodolops Woodburne & Zinsmeister 1984]
Genus †Amphidolops Ameghino 1902 [Anadolops Ameghino 1903; Seumadia Simpson 1935]
Genus †Eudolops Ameghino 1902 [Promysops Ameghino 1902; Propolymastodon Ameghin 1903]
Genus †Pseudolops Ameghino 1902
Genus †Eurydolops Case, Woodburne & Chaney 1988

Order †Yalkaparidontia
Family †Yalkaparidontidae Archer, Hand & Godthelp 1988
Genus †Yalkaparidon Archer, Hand & Godthelp 1988 [Thingodonta; Yalkaperidon (sic)]

Order Notoryctemorphia
Family Notoryctidae Ogilby 1892 (marsupial moles)
Genus †Naraboryctes Archer et al. 2010

Order Dasyuromorphia
Genus †Mayigriphus Wroe 1997b
Genus †Joculosium Wroe 1999b
Family Thylacinidae Bonaparte 1838 (marsupial wolves)
Genus †Maximucinus Wroe 2001
Genus †Muribacinus Wroe 1996
Genus †Mutpuracinus Murray & Megirian 2000
Genus †Badjcinus Muirhead & Wroe 1998
Genus †Nimbacinus Muirhead & Archer 1990
Genus †Ngamalacinus Muirhead 1997
Genus †Wabulacinus Muirhead 1997
Genus †Tyarrpecinus Murray & Megirian 2000
Genus †Thylacinus Temminck 1827 [Paracyon Gray 1842; Paracyon Gray 1827 nomen nudum; Peracyon Gray 1825 nomen nudum; Peralopex Gloger 1841; Lycaon (sic) Wagler 1830 non Brookes 1827]
Family Dasyuridae Goldfuss 1820 (marsupial mice and allies)
Genus †Archerium Wroe & Mackness 2000
Genus †Ganbulanyi Wroe 1998
Genus †Glaucodon Stirton 1957
Subfamily †Barinyainae Wroe 1999
Genus †Barinya Wroe 1999
Subfamily Dasyurinae Goldfuss 1820
Tribe Dasyurini Goldfuss 1820 [Phascolosoricinae Archer 1982; Parantechini Archer 1982]
Genus †Wakamatha Archer & Rich 1979
Genus †Dasylurinja Archer 1982 [McKenna & Bell 1997]
Genus †Ankotarinja Archer 1976 [Archer 1982]
Genus †Keeuna Archer 1976

Order Peramelemorphia
Genus †Crash Travouillon et al. 2014
Genus †Kutjamarcoot Chamberlain et al. 2016
Genus †Thylacotinga Archer, Godthelp & Hand 1993
Superfamily †Yaraloidea Muirhead 2000
Family †Yaralidae Muirhead 2000
Genus †Yarala Muirhead & Filan 1995 
Superfamily Perameloidea Gray 1825 sensu Waterhouse 1838
Genus †Galadi Travouillon et al. 2010
Genus †Bulungu Gurovichet al. 2013
Genus †Madju Travouillon et al. 2015
Family Thylacomyidae Archer & Kirsch 1977 (rabbit-eared bandicoots/bilbies)
Genus †Ischnodon Stirton 1955
Genus †Liyamayi Travouillon et al. 2014
Family Peramelidae Gray 1825 (Australian bandicoots)
Family †Chaeropodidae Gill 1872 (pig-footed bandicoots)
Genus †Chaeropus Ogilby 1838
Family Peroryctidae Archer et al. 1989 (New Guinean bandicoots)

Order Microbiotheria
Family Woodburnodontidae Goin et al. 2007
Genus †Woodburnodon Goin et al. 2007
Family Microbiotheriidae Ameghino 1887 [Clenialitidae Ameghino1909; Mirandatheriinae Szalay 1994] (Monito del Monte)
Genus †Khasia Marshall & de Muizon 1988
Genus †Mirandatherium Paula Couto 1952 [Mirandaia Paula Couto 1952 non Travassos 1937]
Genus †Microbiotherium Ameghino 1887 [Stylognathus Ameghino 1891; Eodidelphys Ameghino 1891; Prodidelphys Ameghino 1891; Hadrorhynchus Ameghino 1891; Proteodidelphys Ameghino 1898; Oligobiotherium Ameghino 1902; Clenia Ameghino 1904; Clenialites Ameghino 1906; Microbiotheridion Ringuelet 1953]
Genus †Eomicrobiotherium  Marshall 1982
Genus †Ideodelphys Ameghino 1902 [Ideodidelphys Schlosser 1923] 
Genus †Kirutherium Goin & Candela 2004
Genus †Pachybiotherium Ameghino 1902
Genus †Pitheculus Ameghino 1894

Order Diprotodontia

Genus †Brachalletes de Vis 1883
Genus †Koalemus de Vis 1889
Genus †Sthenomerus de Vis 1883
Genus †Nimbadon Hand et al. 1993
Family †Palorchestidae Tate 1948
Genus †Propalorchestes Murray 1986
Genus †Ngapakaldia Stirton 1967
Genus †Palorchestes Owen 1874 [Palorchestes Owen 1873 nomen nudum]
Genus †Pitikantia Stirton 1967
Family †Wynyardiidae Osgood 1921 
Genus †Wynyardia Spencer 1901
Genus †Muramura Pledge 1987
Genus †Namilamadeta Rich & Archer 1979 [Wombaroo]
Family †Thylacoleonidae Gill 1872 (marsupial lions)
Genus †Priscileo Rauscher 1987
Genus †Thylacoleo Owen 1848 [Thylacoleon Winge 1893; Schizodon Stutchbury 1853 non Agassiz 1829 non Waterhouse 1842; Plectodon Krefft 1870; Prochaeris De Vis 1886; Thylacopardus Owen 1888]
Genus †Wakaleo Clemens & Plane 1974
Suborder Vombatiformes
Superfamily Phascolarctoidea Woodburne 1984
Family Phascolarctidae Owen 1839 [Koalidae Burnett 1830]
Genus †Cundokoala Pledge 1992b
Genus †Nimiokoala Black & Archer 1997
Genus †Perikoala Stirton 1957
Genus †Madakoala Woodburne et al. 1987
Genus †Litokoala Stirton, Tedford & Woodburne 1967
Genus †Koobor Archer 1976
Superfamily Vombatoidea Burnett 1830
Family †Ilariidae Tedford & Woodburne 1987
Genus †Kuterintja Pledge 1987
Genus †Ilaria Tedford & Woodburne 1987
Family Vombatidae Burnett 1830 [Phascolomidae Gray 1821; Phascolomyidae Owen 1839] (wombats)
Genus †Nimbavombatus Brewer et al. 2015
Genus †Phascolonus Owen 1827 [Sceparnodon Ramsay 1881 non Ramsay 1880] (giant wombat)
Genus †Ramsayia Tate 1951
Genus †Rhizophascolonus Stirton, Tedford & Woodburne 1967
Genus †Sedophascolomys Louys 2015
Genus †Warendja Hope & Wilkinson 1982
Family †Diprotodontidae Gill 1872 [Nototheriidae Lydekker 1887]
Genus †Bematherium Tedford 1967
Genus †Pyramios Woodburne 1967
Genus †Nototherium Owen 1845
Genus †Meniscolophus Stirton 1955
Genus †Euryzygoma Longman 1921
Genus †Diprotodon Owen 1838 [Diarcodon Stephenson 1963]
Genus †Euowenia de Vis 1891 [Owenia de Vis 1888 non Presch 1847 non Delle Chiaje 1841]
Genus †Stenomerus de Vis 1907
Suborder Phalangeriformes Szalay 1982
Family Burramyidae Broom 1898 (pygmy possum)
Family Phalangeridae Thomas 1888 (cuscuses and allies)
Family †Pilkipildridae Archer, Tedford & Rich 1987
Genus †Djilgaringa Archer, Tedford & Rich 1987
Genus †Pilkipildra Archer, Tedford & Rich 1987
Family †Ektopodontidae Stirton, Tedford & Woodburne 1967
Genus †Chunia Woodburne & Clemens 1986
Genus †Darcius Rich 1986
Genus †Ektopodon Stirton, Tedford & Woodburne 1967
Family †Miralinidae Woodburn, Pledge & Archer 1987
Subfamily †Durudawirinae Crosby & Archer 2000
Genus †Durudawirini Crosby & Archer 2000
Subfamily †Miralininae Woodburn, Pledge & Archer 1987 sensu Crosby & Archer 2000
Genus †Barguru Schwartz 2006
Genus †Miralina Woodburn, Pledge & Archer 1987
Suborder Macropodiformes
Superfamily Petauroidea
Family Pseudocheiridae
Genus †Paljara Woodburne, Tedford & Archer 1987
Genus †Pildra Woodburne, Tedford & Archer 1987
Genus †Marlu Woodburne, Tedford & Archer 1987
Genus †Pseudokoala Turnbull & Lundelius 1970
Superfamily Macropodoidea Szalay 1987
Genus †Ekaltadeta Archer & Flannery 1985
Genus †Galanarla Flannery, Archer & Plane 1983
Genus †Nowidgee Cooke 1997
Genus †Purtia  Case 1984
Genus †Wakiewakie Woodburne 1984
Family †Palaeopotoroinae Flannery & Rich 1986
Genus †Palaeopotorous Flannery & Rich 1986
Family †Balbaridae Flannery, Archer & Plane 1983 sensu Kear et al. 2007
Genus †Nambaroo Kear et al. 2007
Genus †Wururoo Cooke 1997
Genus †Ganawamaya Cooke 1992
Genus †Balbaroo Flannery, Archer & Plane 1983
Family Hypsiprymnodontidae Collett 1887 sensu Kear et al. 2007 [Pleopodidae Owen 1878] (musky rat kangaroo)
Genus †Jackmahoneya Ride 1993
Genus †Propleopus Longman 1924 [Triclis de Vis 1888 non Loew 1851] 
Family Potoroidae Gray 1821 [Bettongiinae Bensley 1903; Propleopodidae Archer & Flannery 1985]  (rat kangaroos)
Genus †Gumardee Flannery, Archer & Plane 1983
Genus †Milliyowi Flannery et al. 1992
Genus †Dorcopsoides Woodburne 1967
Genus †Kurrabi Flannery & Archer 1984
Genus †Watutia Flannery & Hoch 1989
Family Macropodidae Gray 1821 sensu Kear et al. 2007 [Halmaturidae Bonaparte 1831; Kangaroidae Gray 1858] (kangaroos and allies)
Genus †Ganguroo Kean, Archer & Flannery 2001
Genus †Wabularoo Archer 1979
Subfamily †Bulungamayinae Flannery, Archer & Plane 1983
Genus †Bulungamaya Flannery, Archer & Plane 1983 
Genus †Cookeroo Butler et al. 2016
Subfamily †Sthenurinae Glauert 1926
Tribe Hadronomini
Genus †Hadronomas Woodburne 1967
Tribe Sthenurini Szalay 1994
Genus †Eosthenurus
Genus †Sthenurus Owen 1874a
Genus †Metasthenurus Prideaux 2004
Genus †Archaeosimos Prideaux 2004
Genus †Simosthenurus Tedford 1966 
Genus †Procoptodon Owen 1874b [Pachysiagon Owen 1874; Pachysiagon Owen 1873 nomen nudum; Simosthenurus Tedford 1966]
Subfamily Macropodinae Gray 1821 [Protemnodontinae De Vis 1883]
Genus †Prionotemnus Stirton 1955
Genus †Congruus McNamara 1994
Genus †Synaptodon de Vis 1889 [Synaptodus Lydekker 1890]
Genus †Fissuridon Bartholomai 1973
Tribe Lagostrophini
Genus †Protemnodon Owen 1873
Genus †Troposodon Bartholomai 1967
Tribe Macropodini Gray 1821 [Halmaturini Goldfuss 1820]
Genus †Baringa Flannery & Hahn 1984
Genus †Bohra Flannery & Szalay 1982

Infraclass Eutheria

Basal Eutheria
Genus †Beleutinus Bazhanov 1972 [nomen dubium] [?zalambdalestid or deltatheroid?]
Genus †Cretasorex Nesov & Gureyev 1981 [nomen dubium]
Genus †Eodesmatodon Zheng & Chi 1978
Genus †Eutrochodon Roth 1903
Genus †Helioseus Sudre 1979
Genus †Horolodectes Scott, Webb & Fox 2006
Genus †Hyotheridium Gregory & Simpson 1926	
Genus †Idiogenomys Ostrander 1983
Genus †Neodesmostylus Khomenko 1928
Genus †Obtususdon Xu 1977
Genus †Prozalambdalestes 
Genus †Sazlestes Nesov 1997
Genus †Telacodon Marsh 1892 [? Leptictida]
Genus †Tingamarra Godthelp et al. 1992
Genus †Wanotherium Tang & Yan 1976
Genus †Veratalpa Ameghino 1905 [?rodent, is based on an astragalus (Hutchison 1974)]

Eutheria incertae sedis
Genus †Acristatherium Hu et al. 2009
Genus †Juramaia Luo et al. 2011
Genus †Eomaia Ji et al. 2002
Genus †Prokennalestes Kielan-Jaworowska & Dashzeveg 1989
Genus †Murtoilestes Averianov & Skutschas 2001
Genus †Bobolestes Nesov 1985 [Otlestes Nesov 1985]
Genus †Montanalestes Cifelli 2000
Genus †Eozhelestes Nesov 1997
Genus †Paranyctoides Fox 1979 sensu Averianov & Archibald 2013 [Sailestes Nesov 1982]
Genus †Bulaklestes Nesov 1985
Genus †Uchkudukodon Archibald & Averianov 2006
Genus †Daulestes Trofimov & Nesov 1979
Genus †Maelestes
Family †Kulbeckiidae Nesov 1993
Genus †Kulbeckia Nesov 1993
Family †Ocepeiidae Gheerbrant et al. 2014
Genus †Ocepeia Gheerbrant & Sudre 2001
Family †Zalambdalestidae Gregory & Simpson 1926
Genus †Anchilestes Qiu & Li 1977 [?Esthonychidae]
Genus †Zhangolestes Zan et al. 2006
Genus †Alymlestes Averianov & Nesov 1995
Genus †Barunlestes Kielan-Jaworowska 1975
Genus †Zalambdalestes Gregory & Simpson 1926

Basal Ungulatomorpha
Genus †Borisodon Archibald & Averianov 2011
Genus †Mistralestes Tabuce et al. 2013
Genus †Sheikhdzheilia Averianov & Archibald 2005
Genus †Sorlestes Nesov 1985
Family †Lainodontinae Gheerbrant & Astibia 2012
Genus †Valentinella Tabuce, Vianey-Liaud & Garcia 2004
Genus †Labes Buscalioni et al. 1992
Genus †Lainodon Gheerbrant & Astibia 1994

Order †Asioryctitheria
Genus †Sasayamamylos Kusuhashi et al. 2013
Family †Kennalestidae Kielan-Jaworowska 1981
Genus †Kennalestes Kielan-Jaworowska 1969
Family †Asioryctitheriidae Szalay 1977 (nomen nudum) [Asioryctidae Kielan-Jaworowska 1981]
Genus †Ukhaatherium Novacek et al. 1997
Genus †Asioryctes Kielan-Jaworowska 1975

Order †Didelphodonta
Genus †Ilerdoryctes Marandat 1989
Genus †Naranius Russell & Dashzeveg 1986
Genus †Paleotomus Van Valen 1967 [Niphredil Van Valen 1978] [?palaeoryctid; Pantolestidae]
Genus †Puercolestes Reynolds 1936
Genus †Suratilestes Bajpai et al. 2005
Genus †Tinerhodon Gheerbrant 1995 [?Hyaenodontidae]
Family †Didelphodontidae Matthew 1918 [?palaeoryctid]
Genus †Didelphodus Cope 1882b [Didelphyodus Winge 1923; Phenacops Matthew 1909]
Genus †Avunculus Van Valen 1966
Genus †Acmeodon Matthew & Granger 1921
Genus †Gelastops Simpson 1935d [Emperodon Simpson 1935d]
Family †Cimolestidae Marsh 1889
Genus †Alveugena Eberle 1999
Genus †Maelestes Wible et al. 2007
Genus †Betonnia Williamson, Weil & Standhardt 2011
Genus †Chacopterygus Williamson, Weil & Standhardt 2011
Genus †Altacreodus Fox 2015 
Genus †Ambilestes Fox 2015
Genus †Scollardius Fox 2015
Genus †Gallolestes Lillegraven 1976 [zhelestid?; Leptictida?]
Genus †Procerberus Sloan & Van Valen 1965
Genus †Telacodon Marsh 1892
Genus †Cimolestes Marsh 1889 [Nyssodon Simpson 1927; Puercolestes Reynolds 1936]

Order †Ptolemaiida
Family †Kelbidae Cote et al. 2007
Genus †Kelba Savage 1965 [Kenyalutra Schmidt-Kittler 1987; Ndamathaia Jacobs et al. 1987 sensu Morales et al. 2000] 
Family †Ptolemaiidae Osborn 1908
Genus †Qarunavus Simons & Gingerich 1974
Genus †Cleopatrodon Bown & Simons 1987
Genus †Ptolemaia Osborn 1908 non McCutcheon & Wilson 1961

Order †Bibymalagasia
Family †Plesiorycteropodidae Patterson 1975 (?-1000 AD)
Genus †Plesiorycteropus Filhol 1895 [Myoryctes Forsyth Major 1908 non Ebert 1863; Majoria Thomas 1915 non]

Order Tubulidentata
Family Orycteropodidae (Gray 1821) Bonaparte 1850 (Aardvarks Eocene?–Recent)
Genus †Scotaeops Ameghino 1887
Genus †Palaeorycteropus Filhol 1893 
Genus †Archaeorycteropus Ameghino 1905
Genus †Myorycteropus MacInnes 1956
Genus †Leptorycteropus Patterson 1975
Genus †Amphiorycteropus Lehmann 2009

Order Macroscelidea
Family Macroscelididae Bonaparte 1838 (elephant shrews)
Genus †Brevirhynchocyon Senut & Georgalis 2014 [Brachyrhynchocyon Senut 2008 non Scott & Jepsen 1936] (elephant shrew)
Subfamily †Herodotiinae Simons, Holroyd & Bown 1991
Genus †Nementchatherium Tabuce et al. 2001
Genus †Chambius Hartenberger 1986
Genus †Herodotius Simons, Holroyd & Bown 1991
Subfamily †Metoldobotinae Simons, Holroyd & Bown 1991
Genus †Metoldobotes Schlosser 1910
Subfamily Rhynchocyoninae Gill 1872
Genus †Miorhynchocyon Butler 1984
Subfamily †Mylomygalinae Patterson 1965
Genus †Mylomygale Broom & Schepers 1948
Subfamily †Myohyracinae Andrews 1914
Genus †Myohyrax Andrews 1914
Genus †Protypotheroides Stromer 1922
Subfamily Macroscelidinae Bonaparte 1838 [Macroscelinae]
Genus †Miosengi Grossman & Holroyd 2009
Genus †Pronasilio Butler 1984
Genus †Palaeothentoides Stromer 1932
Genus †Hiwegicyon Butler 1984

Order Afrosoricida
Family †Todralestidae Gheerbrant 1994 [?Pantolestinae]
Genus †Todralestes Gheerbrant 1991
Family †Adapisoriculidae Van Valen 1967
Genus †Adapisoriculus Lemoine 1885 [Nycticonodon Quinet 1964]
Genus †Bustylus Gheerbrant & Russell 1991
Genus †Proremiculus De Bast, Sigé & Smith 2012
Genus †Remiculus Russell 1964 [?Nyctitheriinae]
Suborder Tenrecomorpha Butler 1972 sensu Seiffert 2010
Genus †Garatherium Crochet 1984
Family †
Genus †Afrodon Gheerbrant 1988
Genus †Dilambdogale Seiffert 2010
Genus †Widanelfarasia Seiffert & Simons 2000
Family †Protenrecinae Butler 1969
Genus †Protenrec Butler & Hopwood 1957
Genus †Erythrozootes Butler & Hopwood 1957
Superfamily Chrysochloroidea Broom 1915
Family Chrysochloridae Gray 1825 (golden moles and relatives)
Genus †Eochrysochloris Seiffert et al. 2007
Subfamily †Prochrysochlorinae Butler 1984
Genus †Prochrysochloris Butler & Hopwood 1957
Subfamily Chrysochlorinae [Amblysominae Simonetta 1957; Eremitalpinae Simonetta 1957]
Genus †Proamblysomus Broom 1941
Superfamily Tenrecoidea Simpson 1931 [Zalambdodonta] (tenrecs and relatives)
Genus †Qatranilestes Seiffert 2010
Family Tenrecidae Gray 1821 [Centetidae] (tenrecs, Madagascar hedgehogs)
Subfamily Geogalinae Trouessart 1881 (large-eared tenrecs)
Genus †Parageogale Butler 1984 [Butleriella Poduschka & Poduschka 1985]
Subfamily †Protenrecinae Butler 1969
Genus †Protenrec Butler & Hopwood 1957
Genus †Erythrozootes Butler & Hopwood 1957

Order Hyracoidea
Oligocene–Recent
Genus †Antilohyrax Rasmussen & Simons 2000
Genus †Dimaitherium Barrow, Seiffert & Simons 2010
Genus †Hengduanshanhyrax Chen 2003
Genus †Namahyrax Pickford et al. 2008
Genus †Rukwalorax Stevens, O'Connor & Roberts 2009
Family Procaviidae Thomas 1892 [Hyracidae Gray 1821] (hyraxes)
Genus †Prohyrax Stromer 1926
Genus †Gigantohyrax Kitching 1965
Family †Pliohyracidae Osborn 1899
Genus †Brachyhyrax Pickford 2004
Genus †Seggeurius Crochet 1986
Genus †Microhyrax Sudre 1979
Subfamily †Geniohyinae Andrews 1906 non Matsumoto 1926
Genus †Geniohyus Andrews 1904a
Subfamily †Pliohyracinae Osborn 1899 non Matsumoto 1926
Genus †Sogdohyrax Dubrovo 1978
Genus †Kvabebihyrax Gabunia & Vekua 1966
Genus †Prohyrax Stromer 1926
Genus †Parapliohyrax Lavocat 1961
Genus †Pliohyrax Osborn 1899 [Leptodon Gaudry 1860 non Sundevall 1835; Neoschizotherium Viret 1947]
Genus †Postschizotherium von Koenigswald 1932
Subfamily †Saghatheriinae Andrews 1906 [Titanohyracinae Matsumoto 1926]
Genus †Meroehyrax Whitworth 1954
Genus †Bunohyrax Schlosser 1910
Genus †Pachyhyrax Schlosser 1910
Genus †Thyrohyrax Meyer 1973
Genus †Megalohyrax Andrews 1903 non Schlosser 1911 [Mixohyrax Schlosser 1910]
Genus †Selenohyrax Rasmussen & Simons 1988
Genus †Saghatherium Andrews & Beadnell 1902
Genus †Afrohyrax Pickford 2004
Genus †Antilohyrax Rasmussen & Simons 2000
Genus †Titanohyrax Matsumoto 1922 [Megalohyrax Schlosser 1911 non Andrews 1903]

Order Sirenia
Eocene–Recent
Genus †Priscosiren Velez-Juarbe & Domning 2014
Genus †Sirenotherium Paula Couto 1967
Genus †Anisosiren Kordos 1979
Genus †Indosiren von Koenigswald 1952 
Genus †Miodugong Deraniyagala 1969
Genus †Paralitherium Kordos 1977
Genus †Sirenavus Kretzoi 1941
Family †Archaeosirenidae Abel 1914
Genus †Eosiren Andrews 1902 [Archaeosiren Abel 1913]
Family †Prorastomidae Cope 1889
Genus †Pezosiren Domning 2001
Genus †Prorastomus Owen 1855
Family †Protosirenidae Sickenberg 1934
Genus †Ashokia Bajpai et al. 2009
Genus †Protosiren Abel 1907
Family †Eotheroididae Kretzoi 1941
Genus †Eotheroides Trouessart 1905 [Eotherium Owen 1875 non Leidy 1853; Masrisiren Kretzoi 1941] 
Family †Prototheriidae Kretzoi 1941
Genus †Prototherium de Zigno 1887 [Mesosiren Abel 1906; Paraliosiren Abel 1906] 
Family †Halitheriidae Gill 1872
Genus †Halitherium Kaup 1855 [Pugmeodon Kaup 1838]
Family Trichechidae Gill 1871 [Manatidae Gray 1821] (manatees)
Subfamily Miosireninae Abel 1919
Genus †Prohalicore Flot 1887
Genus †Anomotherium Siegfried 1965
Genus †Miosiren Dollo 1889
Subfamily Trichechinae Gill 1872 [Halicorea Brandt 1846; Halicoreae Brandt 1833; Manatida Brandt 1868; Manatidae; Manatoidea Gill 1872; Trichechoidea Gill 1872]
Genus †Potamosiren Reinhart 1951
Genus †Ribodon Ameghino 1883
Family Dugongidae (Gray 1821) Simpson 1932 [Halicoridae Gray 1825] (sea cows)
Genus †Caribosiren Reinhard 1959
Subfamily Metaxytheriinae Kretzoi 1941 [Halinassinae Reinhart 1959]
Genus †Metaxytherium de Christol 1840 [Cheirotherium Bruno 1839 non Kaup 1835; Felsinotherium Capellini 1872; Fucotherium Kaup 1840; Halianassa von Meyer 1838; Halysiren Kretzoi 1941; Haplosiren Kretzoi 1951; Hesperosiren Simpson 1932; Pontotherium Kaup 1840]
Subfamily Hydrodamalinae (Palmer 1895) sensu Simpson 1932 Rytinidae Girard 1852] (North Pacific sea cows)
Genus †Dusisiren Domning 1978
Genus †Hydrodamalis Retzius 1794 [Dystomus Fischer von Waldheim 1813; Haligyna Billberg 1827; Manati Steller 1774; Nepus Fischer von Waldheim 1814; Rhytina Berthold 1827; Sirene Link 1794; Stellerus Desmarest 1822]
Subfamily Dugonginae (Gray 1821) Simpson 1932 [Halicorinae Abel 1913; Rhytiodinae Abel 1914; Rytiodontinae Kretzoi 1941; Thelriopiinae Pilleri 1987] (dugongs)
Genus †Callistosiren Velez-Juarbe & Domning 2015
Genus †Nanosiren Domning & Aguilera 2008
Genus †Domningia Thewissen & Bajpai 2009
Genus †Kutchisiren Bajpai et al. 2010
Genus †Crenatosiren Domning 1991
Genus †Bharatisiren Bajpai & Domning 1997
Genus †Corystosiren Domning 1990
Genus †Rytiodus Lartet 1866
Genus †Dioplotherium Cope 1883
Genus †Xenosiren Domning 1989

Order †Embrithopoda
Eocene-Oligocene
Genus †Namatherium Pickford et al. 2008
Genus †Radinskya McKenna et al. 1989
Genus †Heptoconodon Zdansky 1930 [?Lunania Chow 1957 non Hooker]
Family †Arsinoitheriidae Andrews 1904
Genus †Arsinoitherium Beadnell 1902
Family †Palaeoamasiidae Şen & Heintz 1979
Genus †Hypsamasia Maas, Thewissen & Kappelman 1998
Genus †Palaeoamasia Ozansoy 1966 [Palaeoamasia Sen & Heintz 1979 nomen dubious]
Genus †Crivadiatherium Radulesco, Iliesco & Iliesco 1976 [nomen dubious]

Order †Desmostylia

Family †Desmostylidae Osborn 1905 [Cornwallidae Shikama 1957; Paleoparadoxiidae Reinhart 1953] (Miocene–Pliocene)
Genus †Ounalashkastylus Chiba et al. 2015
Genus †Seuku Beatty & Cockburn 2015
Genus †Jamilcotatus Aranda-Manteca & Barnes 1998 [nomen nudum]
Genus †Vanderhoofius Reinhart 1959
Genus †Ashoroa Inuzuka 2000
Subfamily Behemotopsinae Inuzuka 1987
Genus †Behemotops Domning, Ray & McKenna 1986 
Subfamily Cornwalliinae Shikama 1957
Genus †Cornwallius Hay 1923
Subfamily Desmostylinae
Genus †Desmostylus Marsh 1888 [Desmostylella Nagao 1937; Kronokotherium Pronina 1957]
Subfamily Paleoparadoxiinae (Reinhart 1959) Barnes 2013
Genus †Archaeoparadoxia Barnes 2013
Genus †Paleoparadoxia Reinhart 1959
Genus †Neoparadoxia Barnes 2013

Order Proboscidea

Eocene–Holocene
Genus †Daouitherium Gheerbrant & Sudre 2002
Genus †Phosphatherium Gheerbrant, Sudre & Cappetta 1996
Genus †Arcanotherium Delmer 2009
Family †Moeritheriidae Andrews 1906
Genus †Moeritherium Andrews 1901
Suborder †Barytherioidea Andrews 1906
Family †Numidotheriidae Shoshani & Tassy 1992
Genus †Numidotherium Jaeger 1986
Family †Barytheriidae Andrews 1906
Genus †Barytherium Andrews 1901 [Bradytherium Andrews 1901 non Grandidier 1901]
Family †Deinotheriidae Bonaparte 1845 sensu Sanders, Kappelman & Rasmussen 2004
Subfamily †Chilgatheriinae Sanders, Kappelman & Rasmussen 2004
Genus †Chilgatherium Sanders, Kappelman & Rasmussen 2004
Subfamily †Deinotheriinae Bonaparte 1845 (Sanders, Kappelman & Rasmussen 2004 nom. transl. pro Deinotheriidae Bonaparte 1845)
Genus †Prodeinotherium Ehik 1930
Genus †Deinotherium Kaup 1829
Suborder Elephantiformes Tassy 1988
Genus †Eritreum Shoshani et al. 2006
Family †Palaeomastodontidae Andrews 1906
Genus †Palaeomastodon Andrews 1901
Family †Phiomiidae Kalandadze & Rautian 1992
Genus †Phiomia Andrews & Beadnell 1902
Family †Hemimastodontidae McKenna et al. 1997
Genus †Hemimastodon Pilgrim 1912
Infraorder †Mammuthida Tassy & Shoshani 1997
Family †Mammutidae Hay 1922 non Cabrera 1929
Subfamily †Eozygodontinae McKenna, Bell & Shoshani 1997
Genus †Eozygodon Tassy & Pickford 1983
Subfamily †Mammutinae Hay 1922 [Mastodontinae Bonaparte 1845; Zyglophodontinae Osborn 1923]
Genus †Losodokodon Rasmussen & Gutiérrez 2009
Genus †Zygolophodon Vacek 1877 [Turicius Osborn 1926; Mastolophodon Chakravarti 1957]
Genus †Miomastodon Osborn, 1922
Genus †Mammut Blumenbach 1799 [Harpagmotherium Fischer De Waldheim 1808; Mastodon Rafinesque 1814; Mastotherium Fischer De Waldheim 1809; Mastodontum de Blainville 1817; Tetracaulodon Godman 1830; Missourium Koch 1840; Leviathan Koch 1841; Pliomastodon Osborn 1926]
Infraorder Elephantida Tassy & Shoshani 1997
Genus †"Konobelodon" atticus (Wagner 1857) Konidaris et al. 2014
Genus †"Bunolophodon" grandidens
Genus †Morrillia Osborn 1924
Genus †Paratetralophodon Tassy 1983
Family †Choerolophodontinae Gaziry 1976
Genus †Afrochoerodon Pickford 2001
Genus †Choerolophodon Schlessinger 1917[Synconolophus Osborn 1929]
Family †Amebelodontidae Barbour 1927 [Platybelodontinae Borissiak 1928; Protanancinae McKenna, Bell & Shoshani 1997]
Genus †Afromastodon Pickford 2003
Genus †Progomphotherium Pickford 2003
Genus †Archaeobelodon Tassy 1984
Genus †Serbelodon Frick 1933
Genus †Protanancus Arambourg 1945
Genus †Amebelodon Barbour 1927
Genus †Konobelodon Lambert 1990
Genus †Platybelodon Borissiak 1928 [Torynobelodon Barbour 1929; Selenolophodon Chang & Zhai 1978]
Family †Gomphotheriidae Hay 1922 sensu stricto [Trilophodontinae Simpson 1931; Longirostrinae Osborn 1918; Serridentinae Osborn 1921]
Genus †Gomphotherium Burmeister 1837 [Trilophodon Falconer & Cautley 1846; Bunolophodon Vacek 1877; Tetrabelodon Cope 1884; Megabelodon Barbour 1914; Genomastodon Barbour 1917; Serridentinus Osborn 1923; Ocalientinus Frick 1933; Trobelodon Frick 1933; Tatabelodon Frick 1933; Hemilophodon Kretzoi 1942; Kunatia Sarwar & Akhtar 1992]
Family †Gnathabelodontinae-Cuvieroniinae clade [Bunomastodontidae Osborn 1921]
Genus †Sinomastodon Tobien, Chen & Li 1986
Genus †Eubelodon Barbour 1914
Subfamily †Rhynchotheriinae Hay 1922 [Rhynchorostrinae Osborn 1918]
Genus †Rhynchotherium Falconer 1868 [Dibelodon Cope 1885; Blickotherium Frick 1933; Aybelodon Frick 1933]
Subfamily †Gnathabelodontinae Barbour & Sternberg 1835
Genus †Gnathabelodon Barbour & Sternberg 1935
Subfamily †Cuvieroniinae [Notorostrinae Osborn 1921; Humboltinae Osborn 1934; Brevirostrinae Osborn 1918; Notiomastodontinae Osborn 1936; Stegomastodontinae Osborn 1936]
Genus †Amahuacatherium Romero-Pittman 1996
Genus †Stegomastodon Pohlig 1912 [Rhabdobunus Ray 1914]
Genus †Haplomastodon Hoffstetter 1950 [Aleamastodon Hoffstetter 1952]
Genus †Notiomastodon Cabrera 1929
Genus †Cuvieronius Osborn 1923 [Mastodon; Cordillerion Osborn 1926; Teleobunomastodon Revilliod 1931]
Family Elephantidae Gray 1821 (modern elephants)
Genus †Stegodibelodon Coppens 1972
Subfamily †Stegolophodontinae Osborn 1936
Genus †Stegolophodon Schlesinger 1917 non Pohlig 1888 [Prostegodon Matsumoto 1923; Eostegodon Yabe 1950; Tetrazygodon Tobien 1978; Antelephas Sarwar 1979; Rulengchia Zhou & Zhang 1983]
Subfamily †Stegotetrabelodontinae Aguirre 1969
Genus †Stegotetrabelodon Patrocchi 1941
Subfamily †Stegodontinae Osborn 1918 [Cryptomastodontidae Von Koenigswals 1933]
Genus †Stegodon Falconer 1847 [Stegolophodon Pohlig 1888 non Schlesinger 1917; Emmenodon Cope 1889; Parastegodon Matsumoto 1929; Cryptomastodon von Koenigswald 1933; Platystegodon Deraniyagala 1954; Sulcicephalus Deraniyagala 1954]
Subfamily †Elephantinae Gray 1821 [Dicyclotheriinae Deraniyagala 1955] (modern elephants)
Genus †Primelephas Maglio 1970
Genus †Mammuthus Brookes 1828 [Dicyclotherium St. Hilare 1837; Cheirolites von Meyer 1848; Mammonteum De Blainville 1864; Archidiskodon Pohlig 1888; Parelephas Osborn 1925; Metarchidiskodon Osborn 1934] (mammuts)

Order †Leptictida

Family †Gypsonictopidae Van Valen 1967
Genus †Gypsonictops Simpson 1927 [Euangelistes Simpson 1929] 
Family †Didymoconidae Kretzoi 1943 [Tshelkariidae Gromova 1960]
Genus †Zeuctherium Tang & Yan 1976
Genus †Archaeoryctes Zheng 1979
Genus †Hunanictis Li et al. 1979
Genus †Kennatherium Mallett & Szalay 1968
Genus †Ardynictis Matthew & Granger 1925
Genus †Didymoconus Matthew & Granger 1924 [Tshelkaria Gromova 1960]
Family †Leptictidae Gill 1872 [Isacidae Cope 1874; Ictopsidae Schlosser 1887; Ictopsida Haeckel 1895]
Subfamily †Pseudorhyncocyoninae Sigé 1974 [Pseudorhyncocyonidae Storch & Lister 1985]
Genus †Diaphyodectes Russell 1964
Genus †Phakodon Hooker 2013
Genus †Pseudorhyncocyon Filhol 1892
Genus †Leptictidium Tobien 1962
Subfamily †Leptictinae Gill 1872 non Van Valen 1967 [Diacodontinae Trouessart 1879]
Genus †Amphigyion Gingerich & Smith 2006
Genus †Megaleptictis Meehan & Martin 2012
Genus †Myrmecoboides Gidley 1915
Genus †Ongghonia Kellner & McKenna 1996
Genus †Blacktops Meehan & Martin 2010
Genus †Ictopidium Zdansky 1930 [?Erinaceidae: Tupaiodontinae Butler 1988]
Genus †Xenacodon Matthew & Granger 1921
Genus †Protictops Peterson 1934 [?Geolabididae]
Genus †Leptictis Leidy 1868 [Isacus Cope 1873 non Isaca Walker 1857; Mesodectes Cope 1875; Ictops Leidy 1868; Nanohyus Leidy 1869; Ictidops Weber 1904]
Genus †Prodiacodon Matthew 1929 [Palaeolestes Matthew 1918 non De Vis 1911]
Genus †Palaeictops Matthew 1899 [Parictops Granger 1910; Hypictops Gazin 1949]

Order †Cimolesta
Family †Wyolestidae Gingerich 1981
Genus †Wyolestes Gingerich 1981
Genus †Hsiangolestes Zheng & Huang 1984
Genus †Mongoloryctes Van Valen 1966
Family †Palaeoryctidae Winge 1917
Genus †Ottoryctes Bloch, Secord & Gingerich 2004
Genus †Aaptoryctes Gingerich 1982
Genus †Aceroryctes Rankin & Holroyd 2014
Genus †Aboletylestes Russell 1964 [?cimolestid; Didelphodonta]
Genus †Eoryctes Thewissen & Gingerich 1989 non Romer 1966 (nomen nudum)
Genus †Lainoryctes Fox 2004
Genus †Leptonysson Van Valen 1967 [a leptictid or a pantolestid?]
Genus †Naranius Russell & Dashzeveg 1986
Genus †Tsaganius Russell & Dashzeveg 1986 [?Didelphodonta]
Genus †Palaeoryctes Matthew 1913
Genus †Pararyctes Van Valen 1966
Suborder †Ernodonta Ding 1987
Family †Ernanodontidae Ding 1979
Genus †Asiabradypus Nesov 1987
Genus †Ernanodon Ding 1979
Suborder †Apatotheria Scott & Jepsen 1936
Family †Apatemyidae Matthew 1909
Subfamily †Unuchiinae Van Valen 1966
Genus †Unuchinia Simpson 1937 [Apator Simpson 1937 non Semenow 1898]
Subfamily †Apatemyinae Matthew 1909
Genus †Carcinella Von Koenigswald et al. 2009
Genus †Eochiromys Teilhard de Chardin 1927
Genus †Frugivastodon Bajpai et al. 2005
Genus †Heterohyus Gervais 1848 [Necrosorex Filhol 1890; Heterochiromys Stehlin 1916; Amphichiromys Stehlin 1916; Gardomys Sigé 1975; Chardinyus Sigé 1975; Gervaisyus Sigé 1990] 
Genus †Sinclairella Jepsen 1934
Genus †Jepsenella Simpson 1940
Genus †Labidolemur Matthew & Granger 1921
Genus †Apatemys Marsh 1872 [Stehlinius Matthew 1921] 
Suborder †Taeniodonta Cope 1876
Family †StylinodontidaeMarsh 1875a
Genus †Chungchienia Chow 1963 [? tillodont by McKenna & Bell 1997]
Genus †Alveugena Eberle 1999 sensu Alroy 2002
Genus †Onychodectes Coep 1888
Subfamily †Conoryctinae Wortman 1896
Genus †Conoryctella Gazin 1939
Genus †Huerfanodon Schoch & Lucas 1981b
Genus †Conoryctes Cope 1881 [Hexodon Cope 1884 non Olivier 1789]
Subfamily †Stylinodontinae Schlosser 1911
Genus †Schowalteria Fox & Naylor 2003
Genus †Schochia Lucas & Williamson 1993
Genus †Wortmania Hay 1899
Genus †Psittacotherium Cope 1882 [Hemiganus Cope 1882 non Hemicanus Wortman 1897]
Genus †Ectoganus Cope 1874 [Camalodon Cope 1874; Dryptodon Marsh 1876; Conicodon Cope 1894; Lampadophorus Patterson 1949] 
Genus †Stylinodon Marsh 1874b
Suborder †Tillodontia Marsh 1875
Family †Tillotheriidae Marsh 1875 [Esthonychidae]
Subfamily †Deltatheriinae Van Valen 1988 [?Leptictidae]
Genus †Deltatherium Cope 1881 [Lipodectes Cope 1881]
Subfamily †Tillotheriinae Marsh 1875 [Plethorodontidae Huang & Zheng 1987]
Genus †Anchilestes Chiu & Li 1977 [? anagalid]
Genus †Basalina Dehm & Oettingen-Spielberg 1958
Genus †Benaius Wang & Jin 2004
Genus †Franchaius Baudry 1992
Genus †Higotherium Miyata & Tomida 1998
Genus †Kuanchuanius Chow 1963
Genus †Simplodon Huang & Zheng 2003
Genus †Interogale Huang & Zheng 1983 [?Anagalida]
Genus †Plethorodon Huang & Zheng 1987
Genus †Yuesthonyx Tong, Wang & Fu 2003
Genus †Lofochaius Chow et al. 1973
Genus †Meiostylodon Wang 1975
Tribe †Esthonychini [Trogosinae]
Genus †Adapidium Young 1937
Genus †Anthraconyx Rose et al. 2012
Genus †Megalesthonyx Rose 1972
Genus †Esthonyx Cope 1874 [Plesiesthonyx Lemoine 1891; Azygonyx Gingerich 1989] 
Genus †Tillodon Gazin 1953 [Tillotherium Marsh 1875] 
Genus †Trogosus Leidy 1871b [Anchippodus Leidy 1868 (nomen nudum)] 
Suborder †Pantodonta Cope 1873
Genus †Huananius Huang & Zheng 1999
Family †Wangliidae Van Valen 1988 [Alcidedorbignyidae de Muizon & Marshall 1992]
Genus †Alcidedorbignya de Muizon & Marshall 1987
Genus †Wanglia Van Valen 1988 [Harpyodus de Muizon & Marshall 1992]
Superfamily †Bemalambdoidea Zhou, Zhang, Wang & Ding 1973
Family †Bemalambdidae Zhou et al. 1973
Genus †Bemalambda Zhou et al. Ding 1973
Genus †Hypsilolambda Wang 1975
Family †Harpyodidae Wang 1979
Genus †Harpyodus Qiu & Li 1977
Genus †Dysnoetodon Zhang 1980 [?Tillotheriinae]
Superfamily †Coryphodontoidea Marsh 1876
Family †Coryphodontidae Marsh 1876
Genus †Asiocoryphodon Xu 1976
Genus †Coryphodon Owen 1845 [Bathmodon Cope 1872; Metalophodon Cope 1872; Ectacodon Cope 1882; Manteodon Cope 1882; Letalophodon; Loxolophodon Cope 1872]
Genus †Heterocoryphodon Lucas & Tong 1987
Genus †Eudinoceras Osborn 1924
Genus †Hypercoryphodon Osborn & Granger 1932
Genus †Metacoryphodon Zhou & Qi 1982 non Qi 1987
Genus †Procoryphodon Flerow 1957
Superfamily †Pantolambdoidea Cope 1883
Family †Cyriacotheriidae Rose & Krause 1982
Genus †Cyriacotherium Rose & Krause 1982 [Sabatherium McKenna 1972]
Genus †Presbytherium Scott 2010
Family †Pastoralodontidae Chow & Qi 1978
Genus †Altilambda Chow & Wang 1978
Genus †Pastoralodon Chow & Qi 1978 [Convallisodon Chow & Qi 1978]
Family †Titanoideidae Patterson 1934
Genus †Titanoides Gidley 1917 [Sparactolambda Patterson 1939] 
Family †Barylambdidae Patterson 1937
Genus †Barylambda Patterson 1937 [Leptolambda Patterson & Simons 1958 sensu McKenna & Bell 1997] 
Genus †Haplolambda Patterson 1939 [Ignatiolambda Simons 1960]
Family †Pantolambdidae Cope 1883
Genus †Caenolambda Gazin 1956
Genus †Guilielmofloweria Ameghino 1901
Genus †Lopholambda Ameghino 1904
Genus †Pantolambda Cope 1882
Family †Pantolambdodontidae Granger & Gregory 1934 [Archaeolambdidae Flerov 1952]
Genus †Archaeolambda Flerov 1952 [Dilambda Tong 1978; Oroklambda Dashzeveg 1980]
Genus †Guichilambda Huang & Chen 1997
Genus †Nanlingilambda Tong 1979
Genus †Pantolambdodon Granger & Gregory 1934
Suborder †Pantolesta McKenna 1975
Genus †Gobiopithecus Dashzeveg & Russel 1992
Genus †Premontrelestes Smith 2001
Genus †Simidectes Stock 1933 [Pleurocyon Peterson 1919 non Mercerat 1917; Sespecyon Stock 1933 (nomen nudum); Petersonella Kraglievich 1948 (nomen novii)] 
Family †Paroxyclaenidae Weintzel 1933
Genus †Dulcidon van Valen 1965 [a dichobunid??]
Subfamily †Merialinae Russell & Godinot 1988
Genus †Merialus Russell & Godinot 1988
Genus †Euhookeria Russell & Godinot 1988
Subfamily †Paroxyclaeninae Weitzel 1933
Genus †Kiinkerishella Gabunia & Birjukov 1978
Genus †Paroxyclaenus Teilhard de Chardin 1922
Genus †Spaniella Crusafont Pairó & Russell 1967
Genus †Vulpavoides Matthes 1952 [Pugiodens Matthes 1952; Russellites Van Valen 1965] 
Genus †Kopidodon Weitzel 1933
Family †Pantolestidae Cope 1884 [Dyspternidae Kretzoi 1943]
Genus †Aatotomus Rankin 2014
Subfamily †Pentacodontinae Simpson 1937
Genus †Aphronorus Simpson 1935
Genus †Bisonalveus Gazin 1956
Genus †Coriphagus Douglass 1908 [Mixoclaenus Matthew & Granger 1921] 
Genus †Pantomimus Van Valen 1967
Genus †Pentacodon Scott 1892
Genus †Protentomodon Simpson 1928a [?palaeoryctid; Didelphodontia]
Genus †Amaramnis Gazin 1962
Subfamily †Dyspterninae Kretzoi 1943 [Kochictidae Kretzoi 1943]
Genus †Fordonia Marandat 1989 non Gray 1842
Genus †Cryptopithecus Schlosser 1890 [Opsiclaenodon Butler 1946; Androconus Quinet 1965] 
Genus †Dyspterna Hopwood 1927
Genus †Kochictis Kretzoi 1943
Genus †Gobipithecus Dashzeveg & Russell 1992
Subfamily †Todralestinae Gheerbrant 1991
Genus †Todralestes Gheerbrant 1991
Genus †Namalestes Pickford et al. 2008
Subfamily †Pantolestinae Cope 1884 [Cymaprimadontidae Clark 1968]
Genus †Nosella Pelaez-Campomanes 1999
Genus †Propalaeosinopa Simpson 1927 nomen dubium
Genus †Bessoecetor Simpson 1936 sensu Scott, Fox & Youzwyshyn 2002 
Genus †Palaeosinopa Matthew 1901 [Niphredil van Valen 1978]
Genus †Thelysia Gingerich 1982
Genus †Pagonomus Russell 1964
Genus †Pantolestes Cope 1872b [Passalacodon Marsh 1872; Anisacodon Marsh 1872] 
Genus †Bogdia Dashzeveg & Russell 1985
Genus †Chadronia Cook 1954 [Cymaprimadon Clark 1968] 
Genus †Buxolestes Jaeger 1970
Genus †Bouffinomus Mathis 1989
Genus †Galethylax Gervais 1850
Genus †Oboia Gabunia 1989 [? merialine paroxyclaenid]
Genus †Zhigdenia Lopatin 2006

Order Eulipotyphla
Late Cretaceous–Recent
Family †Micropternodontidae sensu McKenna & Bell 1997
Family †Diacodontinae
Family †Creotarsidae
Family †Sespedectidae
Family †Amphilemuridae Hill 1953
Family †Adapisoricidae
Superfamily Erinaceoidea
Family Erinaceidae Fischer de Waldheim 1817
Superfamily Talpoidea
Genus †Hesperoscalops Hibbard 1941
Family †Proscalopidae Reed 1961
Family †Dimylidae
Family Talpidae Fischer von Waldheim 1817
Family †Geolabididae
Superfamily Soricoidea
Family †Apternodontidae
Family †Oligoryctidae Asher et al. 2002
Family †Parapternodontidae Asher et al. 2002
Family †Nyctitheriidae Simpson 1928a
Family Soricidae Fischer von Waldheim 1817
Genus †Dolinasorex Rofes & Cuence-Bescós, 2008
Species †Dolinasorex glyphodon Rofes & Cuence-Bescós, 2008
Genus Notiosorex Coues 1877
Species †Notiosorex harrisi Carroway 2010

Order Dermoptera
Paleocene–Recent
Family †Thylacaelurinae Van Valen 1967
Genus †Thylacaelurus Russell 1954
Family †Plagiomenidae Matthew 1918
Genus †Eudaemonema Simpson 1935
Genus †Elpidophorus Simpson 1927
Subfamily †Plagiomeninae Matthew & Granger 1918
Tribe †Worlandiini Bown & Rose 1979
Genus †Planetetherium Simpson 1928
Genus †Worlandia Bown & Rose 1979
Tribe †Plagiomenini
Genus †Ellesmene Dawson et al. 1993
Genus †Plagiomene Matthew 1918
Family †Mixodectidae Cope 1883 [Oldobotidae Schlosser 1907]
Genus †Dracontolestes Gazin 1941
Genus †Mixodectes Cope 1883 [Indrodon Cope 1884; Olbodotes Osborn 1902]
Family Cynocephalidae Simpson 1945 [Colugidae Miller 1906; Galeopithecidae Gray 1821; Galeopteridae Thomas 1908; Pleuropteridae Burnett 1829; Pterocebineae Lesson 1840]
Genus †Progaleopithecus Ameghino 1904
Genus †Dermotherium Durcrocq et al. 1992
Genus †Cynocephalus Boddaert 1768 non St. Hilaire  & Cuvier 1795 non Swainson 1835 [Colugo Gray 1870; Dermopterus Burnett 1829; Galeolemur Lesson 1840; Galeopithecus Pallas 1783; Galeopus Rafinesque 1815; Pleuropterus Burnett 1829] (Philippine flying lemur)
Genus †Galeopterus Thomas 1908 (Cobego, Sunda/Malayan Flying Lemur)

Order Chiroptera
Eocene–Recent
Genus †Australonycteris Hand et al. 1994
Family †Onychonycteridae 
Family †Icaronycteridae Jepsen 1966
Family †Archaeonycteridae Revilliod 1917
Family †Hassianycterididae Habersetzer & Storch 1987
Family †Tanzanycterididae
Family †Palaeochiropterygidae Revilliod 1917
Family Pteropodidae Gray 1821 [Cephalotidae Gray 1821] (Old World fruit bats, flying foxes)
Family Megadermatidae Allen 1864 (Asian false vampire bats)
Family Rhinopomatidae Bonaparte 1838 (mouse-tailed/long-tailed bats)
Family Rhinolophidae Gray 1825 [Hipposideridae] (horseshoe bats)
Family Phyllostomatidae Gray 1825 [Desmodontidae] (American leaf-nosed bats)
Family Mystacinidae Dobson 1875 (New Zealand short-tailed bats)
Family †Philisidae Sige 1985
Family Molossidae Gray 1821 (free-tailed bats & mastiff bats)
Family Emballonuridae Gervais 1855 (Sac-winged bats, sheath-tailed & ghost bats)
Family Myzopodidae Thomas 1904
Family Natalidae Gray 1866 (funnel-eared/tall-crowned/graceful bats)
Family Vespertilionidae Gray 1821

Order Scandentia
Genus †Nycticonodon Quinet 1964
Family Tupaiidae Gray 1825 (tree shrews)
Subfamily Tupaiinae Gray 1825 [Cladobatina Bonaparte 1838; Glisoricina Pomel 1848] (true tree shrews)
Genus †Palaeotupaia Chopra & Vasishat 1979
Genus †Eodendrogale Yongsheng 1988 non Tong 1988
Genus †Prodendrogale Qiu 1986

Order †Plesiadapiformes
Genus †Pandemonium Van Valen 1994
Family †Palaechthonidae Szalay 1969
Genus †Palaechthon Gidley 1923
Family †Purgatoriidae (Van Valen & Sloan 1965) Gunnell 1981
Genus †Ursolestes Fox, Scott & Buckley 2014
Genus †Purgatorius Van Valen & Sloan 1965
Family †Palaechthonidae van Valen 1995
Genus †Anasazia Van Valen 1994
Subfamily †Palenochthina
Genus †Premnoides Gunnell 1989
Genus †Palenochtha Simpson 1935
Subfamily †Plesiolestinae Gunnell 1989
Genus †Phoxomylus Fox 2011
Genus †Plesiolestes Jepsen 1930 [Talpohenach Kay & Cartmill 1977]
Genus †Torrejonia Gazin 1968
Family †Micromomyidae Szalay 1974
Genus †Dryomomys Bloch et al. 2007
Subfamily †Tinimomyinae Beard & Houde 1989 sensu McKenna & Bell 1997
Genus †Tinimomys Szalay 1974 [Myrmekomomys Robinson 1994]
Subfamily †Micromomyinae
Genus †Chalicomomys Beard & Houde 1989
Genus †Micromomys Szalay 1973
Family †Picrodontidae Simpson 1937
Genus †Draconodus Tomida 1982
Genus †Zanycteris Matthew 1917
Genus †Picrodus Douglass 1908 [Megapterna Douglass 1908]
Family †Picromomyidae Rose & Bown 1996
Genus †Picromomys Rose & Bown 1996
Genus †Alveojunctus Bown 1982
Family †Toliapinidae Hooker, Russell & Phélizon 1999
Genus †Seia Russell & Gingerich 1981 [formerly an erinaceomorph insectivoran]
Genus †Berruvius Russell 1964 [?navajoviine sensu McKenna & Bell 1997]
Genus †Sarnacius Hooker, Russell & Phélizon 1999
Genus †Altiatlasius Sigé et al. 1990 [formerly an omomyid primate]
Genus †Avenius Russell, Phélizon & Louis 1992
Genus †Toliapina Hooker, Russell & Phélizon 1999
Family †Microsyopidae Osborn & Wortman 1892
Subfamily †Microsyopinae (Osborn & Wortman 1892) Matthew 1915
Genus †Arctodontomys Gunnell 1985
Genus †Megadelphus Gunnell 1989
Genus †Craseops Stock 1932
Genus †Microsyops Leidy 1872 [Bathrodon Marsh 1872; Mesacodon Marsh 1872; Palaeacodon Leidy 1872; Cynodontomys Cope 1882]
Subfamily †Uintasoricinae Szalay 1969 [Navajoviinae Gunnell 1989]
Genus †Alveojunctus Bown 1982
Genus †Choctawius Beard & Dawson 2009
Tribe †Navajoviini Szalay & Delson 1979
Genus †Navajovius Matthew & Granger 1921
Tribe †Uintasoricini Szalay 1969
Genus †Niptomomys McKenna 1960
Genus †Nanomomys Rose et al. 2012
Genus †Bartelsia Gunnell 2012
Genus †Uintasorex Matthew 1909b
Family †Paromomyidae Simpson 1940
Genus †Edworthia Fox, Scott & Rankin 2010
Genus †Paromomys Gidley 1923 {Paromomyinae}
Genus †Acidomomys Bloch et al. 2002
Subfamily †Phenacolemurinae Simpson 1955 [Simpsonlemurini Robinson & Ivy 1994; Phenacolemurini Simpson 1955]
Genus †Pulverflumen Robinson & Ivy 1994
Genus †Simpsonlemur Robinson & Ivy 1994
Genus †Dillerlemur Robinson & Ivy 1994
Genus †Ignacius Matthew & Granger 1921
Genus †Phenacolemur Matthew 1915
Genus †Elwynella Rose & Bown 1982
Genus †Arcius Godinot 1984
Family †Chronolestidae
Genus †Chronolestes Beard & Wang 1995
Family Plesiadapidae
Genus †Jattadectes Thewissen, Williams & Hussain 2001
Subfamily †Saxonellinae Russell 1964 sensu McKenna & Bell 1997 [Saxonellidae Russell 1964]
Genus †Saxonella Russell 1964
Subfamily †Plesiadapinae Troussart 1897
Genus †Megachiromyoides Weigelt 1933
Genus †Pronothodectes Gidley 1923
Genus †Nannodectes Gingerich 1975
Genus †Chiromyoides Stehlin 1916
Genus †Platychoerops Charlesworth 1855 [Miolophus Owen 1865; Subunicuspidens Lemoine 1887]
Genus †Plesiadapis Gervais 1877 sensu stricto non Russell 1964/Jepsen 1930 [Tricuspidens Lemoine 1887; Nothodectes Matthew 1915; Menatotherium Piton 1940; Ancepsoides Russell 1964] 
Family Carpolestidae Simpson 1935
Genus †Parvocristes Thewissen, Williams & Hussain 2001
Genus †Subengius Smith, VanItterbeeck & Missiaen 2004
Subfamily †Carpolestinae Simpson 1935
Genus †Elphidotarsius Gidley 1923
Genus †Carpocristes Beard & Wang 1995
Genus †Carpodaptes Matthew & Granger 1921
Genus †Carpolestes Simpson 1928 sensu lato [Litotherium Simpson 1929; Carpomegodon Bloch et al. 2001]

Order Primates
List of fossil primates

Order †Anagalida
Genus †Wania Wang 1995
Family †Pseudictopidae Sulimski 1969 [Mingotheriidae Schoch 1985]
Genus †Anictops Qiu 1977
Genus †Cartictops Ding & Tong 1979
Genus †Paranictops Qiu 1977
Genus †Allictops Qiu 1977
Genus †Pseudictops Matthew, Granger & Simpson 1929
Genus †Mingotherium Schoch 1985 [Uintatheriamorpha?]
Genus †Halticotops Ding & Tong 1979
Family †Anagalidae Simpson 1931 [Peritupaioidea Crusafont Pairó 1966]
Genus †Linnania Chow et al. 1973
Genus †Diacronus Xu 1976
Genus †Huaiyangale Xu 1976
Genus †Palasiodon Tong et al. 1976 [?Mioclaeninae; Hyopsodontinae]
Genus †Eosigale Hu 1993
Genus †Wanogale Xu 1976
Genus †Anaptogale Xu 1976
Genus †Stenanagale Wang 1975
Genus †Chianshania Xu 1976
Genus †Qipania Hu 1993
Genus †Hsiuannania Xu 1976
Genus †Anagalopsis Bohlin 1951
Genus †Anagale Simpson 1931
Genus †Kashanagale Szalay & McKenna 1971
Genus †Wangogale

Order Lagomorpha
Eocene–Recent
Genus †Gomphos Shevyreva 1975
Genus †Hypsimylus Zhai 1977
Genus †Anatolimylus Shevyre 1994
Genus †Dawsonolagus Li, Meng & Wang 2007
Genus †Ephemerolagus Vianey-Liaud & Lebrun 2013
Genus †Erenlagus Fostowicz-Frelik & Li 2014
Genus †Lushilagus Li 1965
Family †Mimotonidae Li 1978
Genus †Mimotona Li 1977
Family †Mimolagidae Erbajeva 1986
Genus †Mimolagus Bohlin 1951
Family †Prolagidae Gureev 1962
Genus †Prolagus Pomel 1853 [Myolagus Hensel 1856; Anoema Koenig 1825; Archaeomys Fraas 1856]
Family Ochotonidae Thomas 1897 [Lagomyidae Lilljeborg 1866; Amphilagidae Gureev 1953;  Prolagidae Gureev 1960; Ochotonida Averianov 1999] (pikas; mouse hares, conies)
Genus †Plicalagus Wu et al. 1998
Genus †Pseudobellatona Topachevs, Nes & Topachevs 1993
Genus †Desmatolagus Matthew & Granger 1927 [Agispelagus Argyropulo 1939; Bohlinotona de Muizon 1977; Procaprolagus Gureev 1960]
Genus †Sinolagomys Bohlin 1937 [Ochotonolagus Gureev 1960]
Genus †Piezodus Viret 1929
Genus †Amphilagus Pomel 1853
Genus †Australagomys Stromer 1926 [a leporid?]
Genus †Marcuinomys Lavocat 1951
Genus †Ptychoprolagus Tobien 1975
Genus †Heterolagus Crusafont Pairo, Villalta & Truyols 1955
Genus †Lagopsis Schlosser 1894 non Rafinesque 1815 nomen nudum [Opsolagus Kretzoi 1941]
Genus †Titanomys von Meyer 1843 [Platyodon Bravard 1853 non Conrad 1837]
Genus †Kenyalagomys MacInnes 1957
Genus †Oreolagus Dice 1917
Genus †Cuyamalagus Hutchison & Lindsay 1974
Genus †Oklaholmalagus Dalquest, Baskin & Schultz 1996
Genus †Albertona Lopez-Martinez 1986
Genus †Bellatona Dawson 1961
Genus †Russellagus Storer 1970
Genus †Gymnesicolagus Mein & Adrover 1982
Genus †Hesperolagomys Clark, Dawson & Wood 1964
Genus †Alloptox Dawson 1961 [Metochotona Kretzoi 1941]
Genus †Ochotonoides Teilhard de Jardin & Young 1931 [Prolagomys Erbajeva 1975]
Genus †Ochotonoma Sen 1998
Genus †Paludotona Dawson 1959
Genus †Pliolagomys Agadjanian & Erbajeva 1983
Family Leporidae Fischer de Waldheim 1817 non Gray 1821 [Leporida Averianov 1999] (rabbits & hares)
Genus †Austrolagomys Stromer 1926
Genus †Coelogenys Illiger 1811
Genus †Shamolagus Burke 1941
Genus †Tsaganolagus Li 1978
Genus †Gobiolagus Burke 1941
Genus †Strenulagus Tong & Lei 1987
Genus †Ordolagus de Muizon 1977
Genus †Litolagus Dawson 1958
Genus †Gripholagomys Green 1972
Genus †Lepoides White 1988
Genus †Valerilagus Shevyreva 1995
Genus †Zaissanolagus Erbajeva 1999
Genus †Trituberolagus Tong 1997
Genus †Romanolagus Shevyreva 1995
Genus †Annalagus Shevyreva 1996 (nomen dubium)
Subfamily †Archaeolaginae Dice 1929
Genus †Panolax Cope 1874
Genus †Pewelagus White 1984
Genus †Notolagus Wilson 1938
Genus †Archaeolagus Dice 1917
Genus †Hypolagus Dice 1917 [Lagotherium Pictet 1853; Pliolagus Kormos 1934]
Subfamily Palaeolaginae Dice 1929 [Mytonilagidae Burke 1941]
Genus †Chadrolagus Gawne 1978
Genus †Limitolagus Fostowicz-Frelik 2013
Genus †Megalagus Walker 1931 sensu McKenna & Bell 1996 [Tachylagus Storer 1992; Montanolagus Gureev 1964]
Genus †Serengetilagus Dietrich 1941
Genus †Mytonolagus Burke 1934
Genus †Palaeolagus Leidy 1856
Genus †Pliopentalagus Gureev & Konkova 1964
Genus †Pliosiwalagus Patnaik 2001
Subfamily Leporinae (Gray 1821) Trouessart 1880
Genus †Nuralagus Quintana, Köhler & Moyà-Solà 2011 (Minorcan giant lagomorph)
Genus †Trischizolagus Radulesco & Samson 1967 [Hispanolagus Janvier & Montenat 1971]
Genus †Pronotolagus White 1991
Genus †Paranotolagus Miller & Carranza-Castañeda 1982
Genus †Notolagus Wilson 1938
Genus †Alilepus Dice 1931
Genus †Pratilepus Hibbard 1934
Genus †Aluralagus Downey 1968
Genus †Aztlanolagus Russell & Harris 1986
Genus †Nekrolagus [Pediolagus Hibbard 1939 non Marelli 1927]

Order Rodentia
Paleocene–Recent

Family †Eurymylidae Dashzeveg & Russell 1988 [Rhombomylidae Li et al. 1987]
Family †Laredomyidae Wilson & Westgate 1991
Family †Cocomyinae de Bruijn, Hussain & Leinders 1982
Family †Ivanantoniidae Shevyreva 1989
Family †Alagomyidae 
Family †Paramyidae 
Family †Cylindrodontidae Miller & Gidley 1918
Family †Sciuravidae Miller & Gidley 1918
Family †Zegdoumyidae Vianey-Liaud et al. 1994
Suborder Sciuromorpha Brandt 1855
Family †Ischyromyidae Alston 1876
Family †Microparamyinae Wood 1962
Family †Theridomyidae Alston 1876
Family †Allomyidae Marsh 1877
Family †Mylagaulidae Cope 1881
Family †Reithroparamyidae Wood 1962
Suborder Ctenodactylomorpha
Family †Laonastidae Jenkins et al. 2005
Suborder Hystricomorpha
Family †Diatomyidae Mein & Ginsburg 1997
Family †Chapattimyinae Hussain, de Bruijn & Leinders 1978
Family †Tsaganomyidae Matthew & Granger 1923
Family †Baluchimyinae Flynn et al. 1986
Family †Diamantomyidae Schaub 1958
Family †Myophiomyidae Lavocat 1973
Family †Phiomyidae Wood 1955
Family †Kenyamyidae Lavocat 1973
Family †Bathyergoididae Lavocat 1973
Family †Heptaxodontidae Anthony 1917
Family †Neoepiblemidae Kraglievich 1926 [Perimyidae Landry 1957]
Family †Cephalomyidae Ameghino 1897
Family †Eocardiidae Ameghino 1891
Suborder Castorimorpha Wood 1955
Family †Eutypomyidae Miller & Gidley 1918
Family Geomyoidea Bonaparte, 1845 
 Subfamily †Mojavemyinae Korth and Chaney, 1999
Family †Rhizospalacidae Thaler 1966
Suborder Anomaluromorpha Bugge 1974
Family †Parapedetidae McKenna & Bell 1997
Suborder Myomorpha Brandt 1855
Family †Protoptychidae Schlosser 1911
Family †Anomalomyidae Schaub 1925
Family †Simimyidae Wood 1980
Family †Armintomyidae Dawson, Krishtalka & Stucky 1990

Order †Condylarthra

Note: The "condylarths" are considered paraphyletic, i.e. a grouping of early ungulate-like mammals not necessarily closely related.
Paleocene–Eocene
Family Arctocyonidae
Genus Arctocyon
Genus Chriacus
Family Periptychidae
Genus Ectoconus
Genus Oxyacodon
Family Hyopsodontidae
Genus Hyopsodus
Family Mioclaenidae
Family Phenacodontidae
Genus Meniscotherium
Genus Phenacodus
Family Protungulatidae
Genus Protungulatum
Family Didolodontidae
Genus Didolodus
Family Sparnotheriodontidae?
Family incertae sedis
Genus Abdounodus
Genus Ocepeia

Order †Mesonychia

Family Triisodontidae
Eoconodon
Goniacodon
Stelocyon
Triisodon
Family Hapalodectidae
Genus Hapalodectes
Family Mesonychidae
Genus Ankalagon
Genus Mesonyx
Mesonyx obtusidens
Genus Dissacus
Genus Jiangxia
Genus Pachyaena
Genus Synoplotherium
Genus Sinonyx
Genus Yangtanglestes

Order †Litopterna

Paleocene–Pleistocene

Family Protolipternidae
Superfamily Macrauchenioidea
Family Macraucheniidae
Genus Cramauchenia
Genus Macrauchenia
Genus Huayqueriana
Genus Paranauchenia
Genus Promacrauchenia
Genus Scalabrinitherium
Genus Theosodon
Genus Victorlemoinea
Genus Windhausenia
Genus Xenorhinotherium
Family Notonychopidae
Family Adianthidae
Superfamily Proterotherioidea
Family Proterotheriidae
Genus Diadiaphorus
Genus Thoatherium

Order †Notoungulata

Paleocene–Pleistocene

Suborder Notioprogonia

Family Henricosborniidae
Family Notostylopidae
Genus Notostylops

Suborder Toxodontia

Family Isotemnidae
Genus Thomashuxleya
Family Leontiniidae
Genus Scarrittia
Family Notohippidae
Genus Rhynchippus
Family Toxodontidae
Genus Adinotherium
Genus Toxodon
Genus Trigodon
Genus Mixotoxodon
Genus Nesodon
Family Homalodotheriidae
Genus Chasicotherium
Genus Homalodotherium

Suborder Typotheria

Family Oldfieldthomasiidae
Family Interatheriidae
Genus Protypotherium
Genus Interatherium
Family Archaeopithecidae
Family Campanorcidae
Genus Campanorco
Family Mesotheriidae
 Subfamily Fiandraiinae
 Genus Fiandraia
 Subfamily Mesotheriinae
 Genus Altitypotherium
 Genus Caraguatypotherium
 Genus Eotypotherium
 Genus Eutypotherium
 Genus Hypsitherium
 Genus Mesotherium
 Genus Microtypotherium
 Genus Plesiotypotherium
 Genus Pseudotypotherium
 Genus Typotheriopsis
 Subfamily Trachytheriinae
 Genus Anatrachytherus
 Genus Trachytherus

Suborder Hegetotheria

Family Archaeohyracidae
Genus Eohyrax
Eohyrax rusticus
Family Hegetotheriidae
Genus Hemihegetotherium
Species Hemihegetotherium trilobus
Genus Pachyrukhos

Order †Astrapotheria
Eocene–Miocene
Genus †Antarctodon Bond et al. 2011
Genus †Astrapodon Ameghino 1891
Genus †Edvardocopeia Ameghino 1901
Genus †Monoeidodon Roth 1898
Genus †Proplanodus Ameghino 1902
Genus †Tonorhinus Ameghino 1904 [Notorhinus Roth 1903 non Leng 1884]
Genus †Pleurystylops Ameghino 1901
Genus †Pseudostylops Ameghino 1901
Genus †Shecenia Simpson 1935
Genus †Traspoatherium Ameghino 1894
Genus †Tychostylops Ameghino 1901
Genus †Tetragonostylops Paula Couto 1963
Family †Eoastrapostylopidae Soria & Powell 1981
Genus †Eoastrapostylops Soria & Powell 1981
Family †Trigonostylopidae Ameghino 1901
Genus †Trigonostylops Ameghino 1897 [Chiodon Berg 1899; Staurodon Roth 1899 non Lowe 1854] 
Family †Albertogaudryinae Simpson 1945
Genus †Albertogaudryia Ameghino 1901
Family †Astrapotheriidae Ameghino 1887
Genus †Isolophodon Roth 1903
Genus †Scaglia Simpson 1957
Genus †Astraponotus Ameghino 1901 [Notamynus Roth 1903; Grypolophodon Roth 1903; Megalophodon Roth 1903]
Genus †Maddenia Kramarz & Bond 2009 non Hook.f. & Thomson
Genus †Comahuetherium Kramarz & Bond 2011
Genus †Parastrapotherium Ameghino 1895 [Liarthrus Ameghino 1895; Traspoatherium Ameghino 1895; Henricofilholia Ameghino 1901; Helicolophodon Roth 1903]
Subfamily †Astrapotheriinae Ameghino 1887
Genus †Astrapothericulus Ameghino 1901
Genus †Astrapotherium Burmeister 1879 [Listriotherium Mercerat 1891; Mesembriotherium Moreno 1882; Xylotherium Mercerat 1891]
Subfamily †Uruguaytheriinae Kraglievich 1928
Genus †Uruguaytherium Kraglievich 1928
Genus †Granastrapotherium Johnson & Madden 1997
Genus †Hilarcotherium Vallejo-Pareja et al. 2015
Genus †Xenastrapotherium Kraglievich 1928 [Synastrapotherium Paula Couto 1976]

Order †Xenungulata
Paleogene
Family †Carodniidae Paula Couto 1952 [Etayoidae Villarroel 1987]
Genus †Notoetayoa Gelfo, López & Bond 2008
Genus †Etayoa Villarroel 1987
Genus †Carodnia Simpson 1935 [Ctalecarodnia Simpson 1935]

Order †Pyrotheria
Eocene–Oligocene
Family †Colombitheriidae Hoffstetter 1970
Genus †Baguatherium
Genus †Colombitherium Hoffstetter 1970
Genus †Proticia Patterson 1977
Family †Pyrotheriidae Ameghino 1889 [Carolozittelidae Ameghino 1901]
Genus †Planodus Ameghino 1887
Genus †Carolozittelia Ameghino 1901 [Archaeolophus Ameghino 1897]
Genus †Griphodon Anthony 1924
Genus †Propyrotherium Ameghino 1901 [Promoeritherium Ameghino 1906]
Genus †Pyrotherium Ameghino 1889 [Ricardowenia Ameghino 1901; Parapyrotherium Ameghino 1902]

Order †Dinocerata
Eocene–Eocene
Family †Uintatheriidae Flower 1876 [Tinoceratidae Marsh 1872; Sphaleroceratinae Brandt 1878; Eobasiliidae Cope 1873]
Genus †Megaceratops Cope 1873
Subfamily †Gobiatheriinae Flerov 1950
Genus †Gobiatherium Osborn & Granger 1932
Subfamily †Uintatheriinae Flower 1876 [Prodinoceratidae Flerov 1952; Bathyopsidae Osborn 1898]
Genus †  Matthew, Granger & Simpson 1929 Jiaoloutherium Tong 1978; Houyanotherium Tong 1978; Zhaia Kretzoi & Kretzoi 2000; Pyrodon Zhai 1978; Phenaceras Tong 1979; Ganatherium Tong 1979; Eobathyopsis Osborn 1929; Mongolotherium Flerov 1952]
Genus †Probathyopsis Cope 1881 [Bathyopsoides Patterson 1939; Prouintatherium Dorr 1958]
Genus †Bathyopsis Cope 1881
Genus †Uintatherium Leidy 1872c [Dinoceras Marsh 1872; Ditetroedon Cope 1885; Elachoceras Scott 1886; Laoceras Marsh 1886; Octotomus Cope 1885; Paroceras Marsh 1886; Platoceras Marsh 1886; Tinoceras Marsh 1872; Uintamastix Leidy 1872]
Genus †Eobasileus Cope 1872 [Uintacolotherium Cook 1926; Lefelaphodon Cope 1872]
Genus †Tetheopsis Cope 1885

Order †Arctostylopida
Family Arctostylopidae Schlosser 1923
Genus †Allostylops Zheng 1979
Genus †Wanostylops Huang & Zheng 1997
Subfamily †Kazachostylopinae Nesov 1987
Genus †Kazachostylopus Nesov 1987
Subfamily †Asiastylopinae
Genus †Asiastylops Zheng 1979
Subfamily †Arctostylopinae [Palaeostylopidae Hau 1976]
Tribe †Sinostylopini
Genus †Sinostylops Tang & Yan 1976
Genus †Bothriostylops Zheng & Huang 1986
Tribe †Arctostylopini
Genus †Arctostylops Matthew 1915
Genus †Palaeostylops Matthew & Granger 1925
Genus †Gashatostylops Cifelli, Schaff & McKenna 1989
Genus †Anatolostylops Zheng 1979

Order †Creodonta
Paleocene–Late Miocene

Genus †Preregidens Solé, Falconnet & Vidalenc 2015
Genus †Prionogale Schmidt-Kittler & Heizmann 1991
Subfamily †Koholiinae Crochet 1988
Subfamily †Machaeroidinae Matthew 1909
Family †Oxyaenidae Cope 1877
Genus †Oxyaena Cope 1873
Genus †Palaeonictis Blainville 1842
Genus †Patriofelis Leidy 1872
Genus †Sarkastodon Granger 1938
Family †Hyaenodontidae Leidy 1869 [Proviverridae Schlosser 1886; Limnocyonidae Gazin 1946; Stypolophinae Trouessart 1885]
Genus †Hyaenodon Laizer & Parieu 1838
Genus †Megistotherium Savage 1973
Genus †Sinopa Leidy 1871

Order Carnivora
Paleocene–Recent

Genus †Ravenictis Fox & Youzwyshyn 1994 [? Carnivoramorpha]

Suborder Caniformia (dog-like carnivores)

Infraorder Arctoidea
Parvorder Mustelida
Family Procyonidae (raccoon family)
Genus Chapalmalania
Family Mephitidae (skunks)
Family Mustelidae (weasel family)
Family Ailuridae
(Red panda family)
Genus Amphicitis
Genus Ekorus
Genus Plesictis
Genus Potamotherium
Parvorder Ursida
Superfamily Amphicyonoidea
Family Amphicyonidae (bear-dogs)
Genus Amphicyon
Genus Cynodictis
Genus Daphoenus
Parvorder Pinnipedomorpha
Family Semantoridae
Superfamily Pinnipedia
Family Enaliarctidae
Genus Enaliarctos
Family Otariidae (eared seals)
Family Odobenidae (walruses)
Genus Imagotaria
Family Phocidae (Earless seals)
Genus Acrophoca
Genus Desmatophoca
Superfamily Ursoidea
Family Ursidae (bears)
Genus Hemicyon
Subfamily Ailuropodinae
Genus Ailuropoda
Ailuropoda microta
Subfamily Tremarctinae (short-faced bears)
Genus Arctodus
Genus Arctotherium
Genus Tremarctos
Florida cave bear (Tremarctos floridanus)
Subfamily Ursinae
Genus Ursus
Auvergne bear (Ursus minimus)
Etruscan bear (Ursus etruscus)
Eurasian cave bear (Ursus spelaeus)
Genus Agriotherium
Genus Ursavus
Infraorder Cynoidea
Family Canidae (Canids)
Genus Canis (dogs and wolves)
Dire wolf (Canis dirus)
 Canis falconeri
 Canis lepophagus
Genus Cerdocyon
Genus Cynodesmus
Genus Leptocyon
Genus Phlaocyon
Subfamily Hesperocyoninae
Genus Hesperocyon
Subfamily Borophaginae
Genus Aelurodon
Genus Borophagus
Genus Epicyon
Genus Osteoborus
Family Miacidae
Genus Miacis

Suborder Feliformia (cat-like carnivores)
[[Image:Smilodon pop2 15.jpg|thumb|Smilodon populator]]

Family Felidae (Felids)
Subfamily Proailurinae
Genus Proailurus
Proailurus lemanensis
Genus Pseudaelurus
Subfamily Machairodontinae (Sabre-toothed cats)
Genus Tchadailurus
Tchadailurus adei
Tribe Metailurini
Genus Metailurus
Metailurus major
Metailurus mongonliensis
Metailurus boodon
Metailurus ultimus
Genus Adelphailurus
Adelphailurus kansensis
Genus Stenailurus
Stenailurus teilhardi
Genus Dinofelis
Dinofelis cristata
Dinofelis diastemata
Dinofelis paleoonca
Dinofelis barlowi
Dinofelis piveteaui
Dinofelis aronoki
Dinofelis darti
Dinofelis petteri
Genus Yoshi
Yoshi minor
Yoshi garevskii
Tribe Smilodontini
Genus Smilodon
Smilodon gracilis
Smilodon fatalis
Smilodon populator
Genus Rhizosmilodon
Rhizosmilodon fiteae
Genus Megantereon
Megantereon cultridens
Megantereon ekidoit
Megantereon inexpectatus
Megantereon microta
Megantereon nihowanensis
Megantereon vakhshensis
Megantereon whitei
Genus Promegantereon
Promegantereon ogygia
Genus Paramachairodus
Paramachairodus orientalis
Paramachairodus miximiliani
Paramachairodus transasiaticus
Tribe Homotherini
Genus Homotherium
Homotherium latidens
Homotherium serum
Homotherium venezuelensis
Homotherium ischyrus
Genus Lokotunjailurus
Lokotunjailurus emgeritus
Lokotunjailurus fanonei
Genus Nimravides
Nimravides catacopsis
Nimravides pedionomus
Nimravides hibbardi
Nimravides galiani
Nimravides thinobates
Genus Xenosmilus
Xenosmilus hodsonae
Genus Amphimachairodus
Amphimachairodus giganteus
Amphimachairodus coloradensis
Amphimachairodus kuteni
Amphimachairodus kabir
Tribe Machairodontini
Genus Machairodus
Machairodus africanus
Machairodus aphanistus
Machairodus horribilis
Machairodus robinsoni
Machairodus alberdiae
Machairodus laskerevi
Machairodus oradensis
Genus Miomachairodus
Miomachairodus pseudaeluroides
Genus Hemimachairodus
Hemimachairodus zwierzyckii
Subfamily Felinae (Conical-toothed cats) 
Tribe Pantherini
Genus Panthera
Panthera atrox
Panthera spelaea
Panthera palaeosinensis
Panthera youngi
Panthera blytheae
Panthera zdanskyi
Panthera gombaszoegensis
Tribe Felini 
Genus Acinonyx
Acinonyx pardinensis
Acinonyx aicha
Acinonyx intermedius
Genus Puma
Puma pardoides
Puma pumoides
Genus Lynx
Lynx issiodorensis
Lynx thomasi
Lynx rexroadensis
Genus Leopardus
Leopardus vorohuensis
Genus Felis
Felis lunensis
Felis imperialis
Genus Pristifelis
Pristifelis attica
Genus Miracinonyx
Miracinonyx inexpectatus
Miracinonyx trumani
Genus Katifelis
Katifelis nightingalei
Genus Asilifelis
Asilifelis coteae
Genus Namafelis
Namafelis minor
Genus Diamantofelis
Diamantofelis ferox
Genus Pratifelis
Pratifelis martini
Genus Sivapanthera
Sivapanthera brachygnathus
Sivapanthera pleistocaenicus
Sivapanthera potens
Sivapanthera linxiaensis
Sivapanthera padhriensis
Genus Sivaelurus
Sivaelurus chinjiensis
Genus Vishnufelis
Genus Dolichofelis
Genus Sivapardus
Family Herpestidae (mongooses)
Family Hyaenidae (hyenas)
Genus Chasmaporthetes
Genus Crocuta
Crocuta spelaea 
Crocuta macrodonta
Crocuta eximia
Crocuta sivalensis
Crocuta dietrichi
Genus Protictitherium
Genus Ictitherium
Genus Chasmaporthetes
Genus Adcrocuta
Genus Pachycrocuta
Genus Percrocuta
Family Nandiniidae
Family Viverravidae (viverravids)
Family Viverridae (civets)
Genus Kanuites
Genus Viverra
Viverra leakeyi
Family Stenoplesictidae
Family Nimravidae (nimravids)
Genus Nimravus
Genus Eusmilus
Genus Hoplophoneus

to be sorted

Genus Lokotunjailurus

Order Xenarthra (Edentata)
Paleocene–Recent

Suborder Cingulata Illiger 1811 [Loricata Owen 1842 non Merrem 1820; Hicanodonta Ameghino 1889] (armadillos)
Family †Protobradydae Ameghino 1902
Genus †Protobradys Ameghino 1902
Family †Peltephilidae Ameghino 1894
Genus †Peltephilus Ameghino 1887 [Cochlops Ameghino 1889; Gephyranodus Ameghino 1891]
Genus †Peltecoelus Ameghino 1902
Genus †Parapeltecoelus Bordas 1938
Genus †Anantiosodon Ameghino 1891
Genus †Epipeltephilus Ameghino 1904
Family Dasypodidae Gray 1821 [Stegotheridae Ameghino 1889; Scoteopsidae Ameghino 1894; Astegotheriidae Ameghino 1906; Tatusidae Burnett 1830; Praopidae Ameghino 1889; Tolypeutidae Gray 1869; Scleropleuridae Lahille 1895]
Subfamily Dasypodinae Gray 1821 sensu Gill 1872
Genus †Punatherium Ciancio et al. 2016
Tribe †Stegotheriini Ameghino 1889 sensu Patterson & Pascual 1968 [Stegotherinae Trouessant 1898]
Genus †Riostegotherium Oliveira & Bergqvist 1998
Genus †Prostegotherium Ameghino 1902
Genus †Pseudostegotherium Ameghino 1902
Genus †Astegotherium Ameghino 1902
Genus †Stegosimpsonia Vizcaíno 1994
Genus †Stegotherium Ameghino 1887 [Scotoeops Ameghino 1887]
Tribe Dasypodini Gray 1821
Genus †Propraopus Ameghino 1881 [Pontotatus Ameghino 1908]
Genus †Dasypodon Castellanos 1925
Genus †Pliodasypus Castro et al. 2014
Subfamily Tolypeutinae Gray 1865 [Tolypeutina Gray 1865; Tolypeutinae Alberdi, Leone & Tonni 1995;  Priodontinae Patterson & Pascual 1968]
Genus †Kuntinatu Billet, Hautier, de Muizon & Valentin 2011
Subfamily Euphractinae Winge 1923
Genus †Coelutaelus Ameghino 1902
Tribe †Utaetini Simpson 1945
Genus †Utaetus Ameghino 1902 [Posteutatus Ameghino 1902; Pareutaetus Ameghino 1902; Orthutaetus Ameghino 1902]
Tribe Eutatini Bordas 1933 [Eutaninae Bordas 1933]
Genus †Meteutatus Ameghino 1902 [Sadypus Ameghino 1902]
Genus †Anteutatus Ameghino 1902
Genus †Pseudeutatus Ameghino 1902 [Pachyzaedyus Ameghino 1902]
Genus †Stenotatus Ameghino 1891 [Stegotheriopsis Bordas 1939; Prodasypus Ameghino 1894]
Genus †Proeutatus Ameghino 1891 [Thoracotherium Mercerat 1891]
Genus †Archaeutatus Ameghino 1902
Genus †Paraeutatus Scott 1903 [Proparaeutatus Trouessart 1905]
Genus †Doellotatus Bordas 1932 [Eutatopsis Kraglievich 1934]
Genus †Chasicotatus Scillato-Yané 1977
Genus †Ringueletia Reig 1958
Genus †Eutatus Gervais 1867
Tribe Euphractini Winge 1923 [Euphractinae Pocock 1924]
Genus †Isutaetus Ameghino 1902
Genus †Anutaetus Ameghino 1902
Genus †Hemiutaetus Ameghino 1902
Genus †Amblytatus Ameghino 1902
Genus †Eodasypus Ameghino 1894
Genus †Prozaedyus Ameghino 1891
Genus †Vetelia Ameghino 1891
Genus †Proeuphractus Ameghino 1886
Genus †Paleuphractus Kraglievich 1934
Genus †Chorobates Reig 1958
Genus †Macroeuphractus Ameghino 1887 [Dasypotherium Moreno 1889]
Genus †Paraeuphractus Scillato-Yané 1980
Genus †Acantharodeia Rovereto 1914 [Macrochorobates Scillato-Yané 1980]
Superfamily Glyptodontoidea
Family †Pampatheriidae Paula Couto 1954
Genus †Tonnicinctus Góis et al. 2015
Genus †Machlydotherium Ameghino 1902
Genus †Kraglievichia Castellanos 1927 [Kraglievichia Castellanos 1937; Plaina Castellanos 1937]
Genus †Vassallia Castellanos 1927
Genus †Scirrotherium Edmund & Theodor 1997
Genus †Pampatherium Gervais & Ameghino 1880 [Pampatherium Ameghino 1875 nomen nudum; Chlamytherium Lund 1839; Clamydotherium Lund 1839 non Bronn 1838; Hoffstetteria Castellanos 1957]
Genus †Holmesina Simpson 1930
Family †Paleopeltidae Ameghino 1895 [Pseudorophodontidae Hoffstetter 1954]
Genus †Palaeopeltis Ameghino 1895 [Pseudorophodon Hoffstetter 1954]
Family †Glyptodontidae Gray 1969 [Haplophoridae Huxley 1864 sensu McKenna & Bell 1997; Doedicuridae Ameghino 1889; Propalaehoplophoridae Ameghino 1891; Sclerocalyptidae Ameghino 1904]
Genus †Heterodon Lund 1838
Genus †Orycterotherium Bronn 1838
Tribe †Neothoracophorini Castellanos 1951
Genus †Pseudoneothoracophorus Castellanos 1951
Genus †Neothoracophorus Ameghino 1889 [Thoracophorus Gervais & Ameghino 1880 non Hope 1840; Myloglyptodon Ameghino 1884; Pseudothoracophorus Castellanos 1951]
Subfamily †Glyptatelinae Castellanos 1932
Genus †Glyptatelus Ameghino 1897
Genus †Clypeotherium Scillato-Yané 1977
Genus †Neoglyptatelus Garlini, Vizcaíno & Scillato-Yané 1997
Genus †Pachyarmatherium Downing & White 1995
Subfamily †Propalaehoplophorinae Ameghino 1891
Genus †Propalaehoplophorus Ameghino 1887 [Propalaeohaplophorus Castellanos 1932; Propaleohoplophorus Frailey 1988]
Genus †Metopotoxus Ameghino 1895
Genus †Eucinepeltus Ameghino 1891
Genus †Asterostemma Ameghino 1889
Subfamily †Doedicurinae Ameghino 1889
Genus †Eleutherocercus Koken 1888
Genus †Prodaedicurus Castellanos 1927 [Palaeodoedicurus Castellanos 1927]
Genus †Comaphorus Ameghino 1886
Genus †Castellanosia Kraglievich 1932
Genus †Xiphuroides Castellanos 1927
Genus †Doedicurus Burmeister 1874
Genus †Daedicuroides Castellanos 1941
Genus †Plaxhaplous Ameghino 1884
Subfamily †Glyptodontinae Gray 1869
Tribe †Glyptotheriini Castellanos 1953
Genus †Glyptotherium [Brachyostracon Brown 1912; Boreostracon Simpron 1929; Xenoglyptodon Meade 1953]
Tribe †Glyptodontini Gray 1869
Genus †Glyptodontidium Cabrera 1944
Genus †Paraglyptodon Castellanos 1932
Genus †Glyptodon Owen 1839 [Lepitherium Saint-Hilaire 1839; Lepidotherium Agassiz 1846; Pachypus D'Alton 1839 non Dejean 1831; Schistopleurum Nodot 1857; Glyptocoileus Castellanos 1952; Glyptopedius Castellanos 1953; Glyptostracon Castellanos 1953]
Genus †Stromatherium Castellanos 1953
Genus †Chlamydotherium Bronn 1838
Genus †Glyptostracon Castellanos 1953
Genus †Heteroglyptodon Roselli 1979
Subfamily †Hoplophorinae Huxley 1864 [Sclerocalyptinae Trouessart 1898]
Genus †Asymmetrura Farina 1981
Genus †Caudaphorus Farina 1981
Genus †Uruguayurus Mones 1987
Tribe †Hoplophorini Huxley 1864 sensu McKenna & Bell 1997
Genus †Hoplophorus Lund 1838 [Sclerocalyptus Ameghino 1891]
Genus †Stromaphorus Castellanos 1926
Genus †Eusclerocalyptus Ameghino 1919
Genus †Hoplophractus Cabrera 1939
Genus †Trachycalyptus Ameghino 1908
Genus †Berthawyleria Castellanos 1939
Genus †Parahoplophorus Castellanos 1932
Genus †Isolinia Castellanos 1951
Genus †Stromaphoropsis Kraglievich 1932
Genus †Eosclerophorus Castellanos 1948
Genus †Trabalia Kraglievich 1932
Genus †Neosclerocalyptus Paula Couto 1957
Tribe †Palaehoplophorini Hoffstetter 1958
Genus †Palaehoplophorus Ameghino 1883
Genus †Aspidocalyptus Cabrera 1939
Genus †Chlamyphractus Castellanos 1939
Genus †Pseudoeuryurus Ameghino 1889
Genus †Protoglyptodon Ameghino 1885
Tribe †Lomaphorini Hoffstetter 1958
Genus †Peiranoa Castellanos 1946
Genus †Lomaphorops Castellanos 1932
Genus †Urotherium Castellanos 1926
Genus †Lomaphorus Ameghino 1889
Genus †Trachycalyptoides Saint-André 1996
Tribe †Plohophorini Castellanos 1932
Genus †Coscinocercus Cabrera 1939
Genus †Phlyctaenopyga Cabrera 1944
Genus †Plohophorops Rusconi 1934
Genus †Plohophorus Ameghino 1887
Genus †Pseudoplohophorus Castellanos 1926
Genus †Teisseiria Kraglievich 1932
Genus †Plohophoroides Castellanos 1928
Genus †Zaphilus Ameghino 1889
Tribe †Neuryurini Hoffstetter 1958
Genus †Neuryurus Ameghino 1889 [Euryurus Gervais & Ameghino 1880 non Koch 1847 non Von Der Marck 1864]
Tribe †Panochthini Castellanos 1927 
Genus †Nopachthus Ameghino 1888
Genus †Panochthus Burmeister 1866 [Schistopleurum Nodot 1855]
Genus †Propanochthus Castellanos 1925
Genus †Parapanochthus Moreira 1971

Suborder Pilosa Flower 1883 [Bradypoda Blumenbach 1779; Anicanodonta Ameghino 1889]
Genus †Trematherium Ameghino 1887
Family †Entelopidae Ameghino 1889 [Entelopsidae Ameghino 1889; Dideilotheridae Ameghino 1894]
Genus †Entelops Ameghino 1887
Genus †Delotherium Ameghino 1889 [Dideilotherium Ameghino 1889]
Infraorder Vermilingua Illiger 1811 emend. Gray 1869 [Scandentia Fischer de Waldheim 1817 non Wagner 1855] (Hairy anteaters)
Genus †Argyromanis Ameghino 1904
Genus †Orthoarthrus Ameghino 1904
Family Cyclopedidae Pocock 1924 (silky/pygmy/two-toed anteater)
Genus †Palaeomyrmidon Roverento 1914
Family Myrmecophagidae Gray 1825 (tamandu)
Genus †Promyrmecophagus Ameghino 1904
Genus †Protamandua Ameghino 1904
Genus †Neotamandua Rovereto 1914
Infraorder Folivora Delsuc et al. 2001 [Phyllophaga Owen 1842 non Harris 1827; Phytophaga Huxley 1871; Tardigrada Latham & Davies 1795 sensu McKenna, Wyss & Flynn 2006 non non Spallanzani 1777; Tardigradae Gray 1821; Gravigrada Owen 1842] (sloths)
Genus †Amphiocnus Kraglievich 1922
Genus †Diellipsodon Berg 1899 [Elipsodon Roth 1898 non Elliopsodon Scott 1892 non Ellipsodon Scott 1892]
Genus †Prepoplanops Carlini, Brandoni & Dal Molin 2013
Genus †Pseudoglyptodon Engelmann 1987
Family †Rathymotheriidae Ameghino 1904
Genus †Rathymotherium Ameghino 1904
Clade †Mylodonta McKenna & Bell 1997
Genus †Baraguatherium Rincón et al. 2016
Genus †Eionaletherium Rincón et al. 2015
Genus †Pseudoprepotherium Hoffstetter 1961
Family †Orophodontidae Ameghino 1895 [Octodontobradyinae Santos, Rancy & Ferigolo 1993]
Subfamily †Orophodontinae
Genus †Proplatyarthrus Ameghino 1905
Genus †Orophodon Ameghino 1895
Subfamily †Octodontotheriinae Hoffstetter 1954
Genus †Octodontotherium Ameghino 1895
Genus †Octomylodon Ameghino 1904
Genus †Octodontobradys Santos, Rancy & Ferigolo 1993
Family †Scelidotheriidae Ameghino 1889 [Nematheridae Mercerat 1891]
Subfamily †Chubutheriinae Scillato-Yané 1977
Genus †Chubutherium Cattoi 1962
Subfamily †Scelidotheriinae Ameghino 1889 
Genus †Sibyllotherium Scillato-Yane & Carlini 1998
Genus †Scelidotheriops Ameghino 1904
Genus †Analcitherium Ameghino 1891
Genus †Elassotherium Cabrera 1939
Tribe †Nematheriini
Genus †Nematherium Ameghino 1887 [Ammotherium Ameghino 1891; Lymodon Ameghino 1891]
Tribe †Scelidotheriini
Genus †Proscelidodon Bordas 1935
Genus †Catonyx Ameghino 1891 [Platyonyx Lund 1840 non Schoenherr 1826; Scelidodon Ameghino 1881; Scelidotherium (Catonyx) Ameghino 1891]
Genus †Neonematherium Ameghino 1904
Genus †Scelidotherium Owen 1839 [Spenodon Lund 1839; Sphenodontherium Trouessart 1905; Matschieella Poche 1904; (Scelidodon) Ameghino 1889; (Scelidotheridium) Kraglievich 1934]
Family †Mylodontidae Gill 1872
Genus †Mirandabradys
Genus †Paraglossotherium Esteban 1993
Genus †Urumacotherium Bocquentin-Villanueva 1983
Subfamily †Mylodontinae Gill 1872
Genus †Glossotheriopsis Scillato-Yané 1976
Genus †Promylodon Ameghino 1883
Genus †Strabosodon Ameghino 1891
Genus †Megabradys Scillato-Yané 1981
Genus †Pleurolestodon Rovereto 1914
Genus †Mylodon Owen 1839 [Gnathopsis Leidy 1852; Grypotherium Reinhardt 1879; Quatriodon Ameghino 1881; Mesodon Ameghino 1882 non Rafinesque 1821 non Wagner 1851; Tetrodon Ameghino 1882 non Linnaeus 1766; Glossotherium non Owen 1839]
Subfamily †Lestodontinae Ameghino 1889
Genus †Bolivartherium
Tribe †Thinobadistini McKenna & Bell 1997
Genus †Thinobadistes Hay 1919
Genus †Sphenotherus Ameghino 1891
Tribe †Lestodontini Ameghino 1889
Genus †Lestodon Gervais 1855 [Plioganphiodon Ameghino 1884; Prolestodon Kraglievich 1932]
Genus †Lestodontidion Roselli 1976
Tribe †Glossotheriini McKenna & Bell 1997
Genus †Acremylodon Mones 1986 [Stenodon Frailey 1986 non (sic) Ameghino 1885 non Lesson 1842 non Rafinesque 1818 non Van Beneden 1865]
Genus †Ranculcus Ameghino 1891
Genus †Glossotherium Owen 1839 [Eumylodon Ameghino 1904; Pseudolestodon Gervais & Ameghino 1880; Laniodon Ameghino 1881; Interodon Ameghino 1885; Nephotherium Ameghino 1886; Glossotheridium Kraglievich 1934; (Oreomylodon) Hoffstetter 1949]
Genus †Mylodonopsis Cartelle 1991
Genus †Paramylodon Brown 1903 [Orycterotherium Harlan 1841 non Bronn 1838; Eubradys Leidy 1853]
Clade Megatheria McKenna & Bell 1997
Family Megalonychidae Gervais 1855 [Choloepidae Pocock 1924]
Family †Megatheriidae Gray 1821 [Schismotheridae Mercerat 1891]
Family †Nothrotheriidae Ameghino 1920 sensu de Muizon, McDonald, Salas & Urbina 2004

Order Pholidota
Eocene–Recent
Genus †Arcticanodon Rose, Eberle & McKenna 2004
Genus †Melaniella Fox 1984
Family †Escavadodontidae Rose & Lucas 2000
Genus †Escavadodon Rose & Lucas 2000
Family †Epoicotheriidae Simpson 1927
Genus †Amelotabes Rose 1978
Genus †Alocodontulum Rose, Bown & Simons 1978 [Alocodon Rose, Bown & Simons 1977 non Thulborn 1973] 
Genus †Auroratherium  Tong & Wamg 1997
Genus †Pentapassalus Gazin 1952
Genus †Dipassalus Rose, Krishtalka & Stucky 1991
Genus †Tetrapassalus Simpson 1959a
Genus †Epoicotherium Simpson 1927 [Xenotherium Douglass 1906 non Ameghino 1904; Pseudochrysochloris Turnbull & Reed 1967] 
Genus †Tubulodon Jepsen 1932
Genus †Xenocranium Colbert 1942
Family †Metacheiromyidae Wortman 1903
Genus †Propalaeanodon Rose 1979
Genus †Palaeanodon Matthew 1918
Genus †Brachianodon Gunnell & Gingerich 1993
Genus †Mylanodon Secord et al. 2002
Genus †Metacheiromys Wortman 1903
Suborder Pholidota Weber 1904 sensu stricto [Manidae Gray 1821 sensu lato] (pangolins/scaly anteaters)
Genus †Argyromanis Ameghino 1904
Genus †Orthoarthrus Ameghino 1904
Genus †Euromanis Gaudin, Emry & Wible 2009
Family †Eurotamanduidae Szalay & Schrenk 1994
Genus †Eurotamandua Storch 1978
Infraorder Eupholidota Gaudin, Emry & Wible 2009
Family †Eomanidae Storch 2003
Genus †Eomanis Storch 1978
Superfamily Manoidea
Genus †Necromanis Filhol 1893 [Leptomanis Filhol 1893; Necrodasypus Filhol 1893; Teutomanis Ameghino 1905; Galliaetatus Ameghino 1905] 
Family †Patriomanidae Szalay & Schrenk 1998 sensu Gaudin, Emry & Pogue 2006
Genus †Patriomanis Emry 1970
Genus †Cryptomanis Gaudin, Emry & Pogue 2006
Family Manidae Gray 1821

Infraorder Cetacea
Eocene–Recent

Parvorder Archaeoceti
Family Raoellidae
Genus Indohyus
Family Pakicetidae
Genus Pakicetus
Pakicetus inachus
Genus Gandakasia
Genus Nalacetus
Genus Ichthyolestes
Family Ambulocetidae
Genus Ambulocetus
Genus Himalayacetus
Family Remingtonocetidae
Genus Kutchicetus
Family Protocetidae
Genus Rodhocetus (??? Ma)
Rhodocetus kasrani
Rodhocetus balochistanensis
Genus Protocetus
Family Dorudontidae
Genus Dorudon (40–36 Ma)
Dorudon atrox
Genus Zygorhiza
Family Basilosauridae
Genus Basilosaurus (40–37 Ma)
Basilosaurus cetoides
Basilosaurus hussaini
Basilosaurus isis

Suborder Mysticeti

Family Mammalodontidae
Genus Mammalodon
Family Cetotheriidae
Genus Cetotherium
Genus Piscobalaena
Family Janjucetidae
Genus Janjucetus

to be sorted
Genus Eobalaenoptera
Eobalaenoptera harrisoni

Suborder Odontoceti

Family Squalodontidae
Genus Prosqualodon
Genus Squalodon (shark tooth dolphin)
Family Eurhinodelphidae
Genus Eurhinodelphis
Family Kentriodontidae
Genus Kentriodon
Family Rhabdosteidae
Genus Rhabdosteus
Family Odobenocetopsidae
Genus Odobenocetops

Order Perissodactyla
Eocene–Recent

Suborder Hippomorpha

Superfamily Brontotheroidea
Family Brontotheriidae
Genus Pakotitanops
Genus Nanotitanops
Subfamily Lambdotheriinae
Genus Lambdotherium
Genus Xenicohippus
Subfamily Palaeosyopinae
Genus Palaeosyops
Genus Mulkrajanops
Subfamily Dolichorhininae
Genus Metarhinus
Genus Sphenocoelus
Genus Mesatirhinus
Subfamily Brontotheriinae
Genus Duchesneodus
Genus Megacerops
Subfamily Embolotheriinae
Genus Titanodectes
Genus Embolotherium
Genus Protembolotherium
Subfamily Brontopinae
Genus Brachydiastematherium
Genus Pachytitan
Genus Dianotitan
Genus Gnathotitan
Genus Microtitan
Genus Epimanteoceras
Genus Protitan
Genus Rhinotitan
Genus Metatitan
Genus Dolichorhinus
Genus Protitanotherium
Genus Parabrontops
Genus Oreinotherium
Genus Brontops
Genus Protitanops
Genus Pygmaetitan
Subfamily Telmatheriinae
Genus Acrotitan
Genus Desmatotitan
Genus Arctotitan
Genus Hyotitan
Genus Sthenodectes
Genus Telmatherium
Genus Sivatitanops
Subfamily Menodontinae
Genus Diplacodon
Genus Eotitanotherium
Genus Notiotitanops
Genus Menodus
Genus Ateleodon
Superfamily Pachynolophoidea
Family Pachynolophidae
Superfamily Equoidea
Family Palaeotheriidae
Genus Hyracotherium
Genus Propalaeotherium
Genus Palaeotherium
Family Equidae
Genus Miohippus
Genus Orohippus
Genus Mesohippus
Subfamily Anchitheriinae
Genus Sinohippus
Genus Megahippus
Genus Anchitherium
Subfamily Equinae
Genus Archaeohippus
Genus Cormohipparion
Genus Eurygnathohippus
Genus Hipparion
Genus Hippidion
Genus Hippotherium
Genus Merychippus
Genus Parahippus
Genus Pliohippus
Genus Scaphohippus

Suborder Ceratomorpha

Superfamily Rhinocerotoidea
Family Amynodontidae (hippo-rhinos)
Subfamily Amynodontinae
Subfamily Metamynodontinae
Genus Metamynodon
Family Hyracodontidae (giant rhinos)
Subfamily Indricotheriinae
Genus Forstercooperia
Genus Juxia
Genus Benaratherium?
Genus Urtinotherium
Genus Indricotherium
Baluchitherium (Indricotherium transouralicum)
Genus Paraceratherium
Paraceratherium bugtiense
Subfamily Allaceropinae
Subfamily Hyracodontinae
Genus Hyracodon
Family Rhinocerotidae (rhinos)
Genus Teleoceras
Genus Trigonias
Subfamily Rhinocerotinae
Genus Coelodonta
Woolly rhinoceros (Coelodonta antiquitatis)
Genus Dicerorhinus (Sumatran rhinoceros)
Dicerorhinus leakeyi
Subfamily Elasmotheriinae
Genus Sinotherium
Genus Iranotherium
Genus Menoceras
Genus Elasmotherium
Elasmotherium caucasicum
Giant rhinoceros (Elasmotherium sibiricum)
Superfamily Tapiroidea
Genus Hyrachyus
Family Helaletidae
Genus Lophiodon
Family Tapiridae
Miotapirus
Superfamily Chalicotheroidea
Family Lophiodontidae
Genus Lophiodon
Genus Lophiaspis
Family Chalicotheriidae
Subfamily Chalicotheriinae
Genus Chalicotherium
Genus Anisodon
Genus Nestoritherium
Subfamily Schizotheriinae
Genus Ancylotherium
Genus Borissiakia
Genus Chemositia
Genus Kalimantsia
Genus Limognitherium
Genus Moropus
Genus Tylocephalonyx

Order Artiodactyla
Eocene–Recent

Suborder Suina

Family Dichobunidae
Genus Messelobunodon
Genus Diacodexis
Family Entelodontidae (Entelodonts)
Genus Archaeotherium
Genus Brachyhyops
Genus Paraentelodon
Genus Cypretherium
Genus Daeodon
Genus Eoentelodon
Genus Entelodon
Genus Dinohyus
Family Suidae (pigs)
Genus Metridiochoerus
Genus Kubanochoerus
Genus Kolpochoerus
Genus Nyanzachoerus
Genus Notochoerus
Family Tayassuidae (peccaries)
Genus Platygonus
Genus Mylohyus
Family Oreodontidae (Oreodonts)
Genus Promerycochoerus
Genus Merycoidodon
Genus Brachycrus
Genus Leptauchenia
Genus Sespia
Genus Mesoreodon
Genus Miniochoerus
Genus Eporeodon
Family Cainotheriidae
Genus Cainotherium
Family Hippopotamidae (hippopotamii)
Genus Archaeopotamus
Genus Hippopotamus
Hippopotamus gorgops
European hippopotamus (Hippopotamus antiquus)
Madagascan hippo (Hippopotamus madagascariensis)
Madagascan dwarf hippo (Hippopotamus lemerlei)
Cretan dwarf hippopotamus (Hippopotamus creutzburgi)
Maltese hippopotamus (Hippopotamus melitensis)
Sicilian hippopotamus (Hippopotamus pentlandi)
Genus Hexaprotodon
Hexaprotodon harvardi
Madagascan pygmy hippo (Hexaprotodon madagascariensis)
Genus Phanourios
Cyprus dwarf hippopotamus (Phanourios minutus)
Genus Kenyapotamus
Family Anthracotheriidae
Genus Elomeryx
Genus Bothriogenys
Genus Bothriodon
Genus Anthracotherium
Genus Libycosaurus
Genus Merycopotamus

Suborder Tylopoda

Family Camelidae (camels)
Genus Aepycamelus (Miocene)
Genus Camelops (Pliocene – Pleistocene)
Genus Camelus
 Camelus gigas
 Camelus hesternus
 Camelus moreli
 Camelus sivalensis
Genus Oxydactylus
Genus Poebrotherium
Genus Procamelus (Miocene)
Genus Stenomylus
Genus Titanotylopus (Miocene – Pleistocene)
Family Oromerycidae
Genus Protylopus

Suborder Ruminantia

Family Protoceratidae
Genus Protoceras
Genus Syndyoceras
Genus Synthetoceras
Genus Kyptoceras
Genus Pseudoprotoceras
Family Climacoceratidae
Genus Climacoceras
Genus Prolibytherium
Prolibytherium magnieri (Miocene)
Genus Orangemeryx
Family Tragulidae (chevrotains)
Genus Dorcatherium
Genus Dorcabune
Genus Siamotragulus
Genus Yunnanotherium
Family Giraffidae (giraffes)
Genus Eumeryx (Oligocene)
Genus Palaeotragus
Palaeotragus primaevus (Miocene)
Palaeotragus germaini (Miocene)
Genus Amotherium
Amotherium africanum (Miocene)
Genus Samotherium (Miocene–Pliocene)
Samotherium boissieri (Pliocene)
Genus Sivatherium
Sivatherium giganteum (Pleistocene)
Sivatherium maurusium (Pleistocene)
Genus Bohlinia (Miocene)
Bohlinia attica (synonym: Giraffa attica)
Genus Bramatherium
Genus Giraffokeryx
Genus Helladotherium
Genus Honanotherium
Genus Libytherium
Genus Mitilanotherium
Genus Shansitherium
Genus Okapia (okapis)
Okapia stillei (Pleistocene)
Genus Giraffa (giraffes)
Giraffa punjabiensis (Pliocene)
Giraffa priscilla (Pliocene)
Giraffa jumae (Pleistocene)
Giraffa gracilis (Pleistocene)
Giraffa sivalensis (Pleistocene)
Family Leptomericidae
Genus Leptomeryx
Family Archaeomerycidae
Genus Archaeomeryx
Family Palaeomerycidae
Genus Ampelomeryx
Genus Cranioceras
Genus Pediomeryx
Genus Triceromeryx
Family Hoplitomerycidae
Genus Hoplitomeryx
Family Moschidae (musk deers)
Genus Blastomeryx
Genus Longirostromeryx
Family Cervidae (deer)
Subfamily Muntiacinae (muntjacs)
Genus Dicrocerus
Genus Heteroprox
Subfamily Cervinae
Genus Candiacervus
Candiacervus ropalophorus
Candiacervus major
Candiacervus pygadiensìs
Candiacervus cretensis
Genus Megaloceros
Irish elk (Megaloceros giganteus) (died ~5700 BC)
Genus Eucladoceros
Genus Sinomegaceros
Subfamily Capreolinae
 Alces carnutorum (Carnute elk)
Genus Navahoceros
American mountain deer Navahoceros fricki
Genus Libralces
Genus Odocoileus
Odocoileus lucasi
Genus Cervalces
Stag-moose Cervalces scotti
Family Antilocapridae (pronghorns)
Genus Capromeryx
Capromeryx minor
Genus Hayoceros
Genus Ilingoceros
Genus Cosoryx
Genus Meryceros
Genus Merycodus
Genus Paracosoryx
Genus Ramoceros
Genus Submeryceros
Genus Proantilocapra
Genus Osbornoceros
Genus Ottoceros
Genus Plioceros
Genus Sphenophalos
Genus Ceratomeryx
Genus Hexameryx
Genus Hexobelomeryx
Genus Stockoceros
Genus Tetrameryx
Genus Texoceros
Genus Antilocapra
 Antilocapra maquinensis
Family Bovidae (Bovids)
Subfamily Bovinae
Genus Bos
Bos acutifrons
Bos planifrons
Aurochs (Bos primigenius) (died 1627)
Genus Bison
Ancient bison (Bison antiquus)
Steppe wisent (Bison priscus) (died Late Pleistocene)
Giant bison (Bison latifrons)
Bison occidentalis
Genus Bubalus
Bubalus cebuensis
Genus Pelorovis
Genus Eotragus
Genus Kipsigicerus
Genus Leptobos
Subfamily Alcelaphinae
Genus Megalotragus
Genus Parmularius
Subfamily Antilopinae
Genus Gazella
Gazella psolea
Gazella borbonica
Gazella deperdita
Gazella gaudryi
Gazella triquetrucornis
Subfamily Caprinae
Genus Bootherium
Harlan's muskox Bootherium bombifrons
Genus Capra
Capra dalii
Genus Euceratherium
Shrub-ox Euceratherium collinum
Genus Myotragus
Cave goat Myotragus balearicus
Genus Oioceros

See also
 List of placental mammals (living species)
 List of monotremes and marsupials (living species)

References

 
 
 
 

List of
Prehistoric
Mammals